= Aileen Davies =

English singer and actress (1902–1981)

Davies in 1926

Albena Aileen Davies (30 June 1902 – 5 May 1981) was an English singer and actress who was the principal mezzo-soprano with the D'Oyly Carte Opera Company from 1925 to 1928, known for her vivaciousness on stage. She sang the roles of Pitti Sing in The Mikado and Tessa in The Gondoliers in the first two electrical recordings made by D'Oyly Carte.

Born in Cornwall and raised there and later in Wales, Davies became interested in theatre in school and, by her 21st birthday, she had joined the D'Oyly Carte Opera Company, playing small roles and chorus roles, as well as understudying the principal soubrette roles. In her third season with the company, 1925–1926, she was promoted and played all nine of the principal mezzo-soprano roles in the company's repertory, both on tour and in London. She then left the stage, married and moved to Edinburgh. During her marriage, which became increasingly unhappy, she directed amateur Gilbert and Sullivan companies into the 1950s, and she managed a shop selling kitchen utensils in her last years.

== Early life ==
Davies was born in Fowey, in Cornwall, the middle child of three children of William Joseph Davies (c. 1867 – 1924), a marine commander, and Annie née Veale, who also was from a family of mariners. Her brother, Seymour, was born in about 1890, and her sister Daisy Annie, but called "Joan", was born in 1904. Her father worked for a company called Furness Withy. During Davies's childhood, his ship required repairs during a Mediterranean voyage. Instead of following company protocol and waiting for service, her father sailed the ship back to England; he was dismissed. To provide for the family, her mother ran a hotel in St Austell. Eileen's father took her on sea fishing trips. When she was 11 years old, her father got a job at Newport, Wales, in the docks. Around this time, Davies went to Thelema school at Newquay in Cornwall, later joining her family in Newport. Davies enjoyed singing as a child and had some singing lessons in Newquay. At school, she also enjoyed acting in plays. She continued her singing lessons in Newport and took part in her first Gilbert and Sullivan opera, The Gondoliers. She also had an opportunity to sing on a radio station broadcast in Cardiff. Having seen a D'Oyly Carte Opera Company performance of The Gondoliers, shortly before her 21st birthday in 1923, Davies decided to audition for the company.

== D'Oyly Carte ==
In July 1923, at the age of 21, Davies was engaged by D'Oyly Carte and, during her first season, played chorus roles in eight of the operas in the company's repertory, as well as the small roles of the First Bridesmaid in Trial by Jury, Peep-Bo in The Mikado, Giulia in The Gondoliers and often Edith in The Pirates of Penzance. She was paid £4 per week as a chorister that year. She also understudied all of the principal mezzo-soprano roles then in the company's repertory and in her first year stepped into the roles of Angela in Patience, the title role in Iolanthe, Mad Margaret in Ruddigore, Phoebe in The Yeomen of the Guard and Tessa in The Gondoliers. After touring that season, the company played a six-month season at the Prince's Theatre In her second season with the company, 1924–1925, she continued to play First Bridesmaid, Peep Bo and Giulia, swapped Edith for Kate in Pirates, and took on the additional small parts of the fairy Leila in Iolanthe and later Ruth in Ruddigore and briefly Saphir in Patience. Her salary increased that year to £5 per week. That season she had occasions, as understudy, to play Melissa in Princess Ida, Margaret in Ruddigore, Phoebe in Yeomen and Tessa in The Gondoliers.

Celebrating the end of the 1926 London season: front row, from left: Bertha Lewis, Rupert D'Oyly Carte, Lady Gilbert, Henry Lytton, Lady Dorothy Carte (in profile), Winifred Lawson, Darrell Fancourt and Davies. Behind Lewis: Eleanor Evans; behind Lytton: Leo Sheffield and Sargent.

At the beginning of her third season in July 1925, after Eileen Sharp had departed from the D'Oyly Carte Opera Company, no new principal soubrette had been appointed. For two months, Davies rotated in the principal mezzo-soprano roles with Beatrice Elburn and Gertrude Wolfle. Meanwhile, Davies also shared her earlier small parts of First Bridesmaid and Kate in Pirates, as well as Ruth in Ruddigore. Finally, on 28 September 1925, Davies, now 23 years old, was promoted and took over all nine principal mezzo-soprano roles then in the company's repertory full time: Cousin Hebe in H.M.S. Pinafore, Edith in Pirates, Angela in Patience, the title role in Iolanthe, Melissa in Princess Ida, Pitti-Sing in The Mikado, Margaret in Ruddigore, Phoebe in Yeomen and Tessa in The Gondoliers; she continued as principal soubrette until June 1928, both on tour and at the Prince's Theatre. Her salary was increased to £8 per week for her first season as a principal, £12 thereafter, and £13 when playing in the West End. In addition to the company's special "Last Night" performance each season, on a few other occasions Davies had opportunities to give special performances, including at a benefit matinee for the Shakespeare Memorial Theatre Fund, at the Theatre Royal, Drury Lane, on 9 November 1926 before the king and queen, among other dignitaries. There Davies played the spirit Iris in a scene from act 4 of The Tempest, singing a passage that had been set to music by Arthur Sullivan. She also took part in the company's tour of Canada in 1926–1927.

Davies's biographer Tony Joseph describes her as "vivacious; she was unmistakably the centre of attention [and] a majority of [her] admirers were male". At stage doors and in correspondence, her fans "engaged her in a sort of joyous mutual flirtation", and she enjoyed both the audience and press attention. Joseph states that she was a "natural" both as a singer and actress, with an "intuitive affinity for and understanding of music and stagecraft", a "precise ... strong and assured" vocal tone and "beautifully clear" diction; he concludes that her petite, striking looks, "robust" physicality, "cheekiness", and "pertness" were right for the Gilbert and Sullivan soubrette parts. Her critical reviews were nearly always positive: Hebe: "most attractive" and "singing and acting charmingly; Iolanthe: "Her singing of Iolanthe's [act 2] appeal ... in beauty of tone and wealth of feeling ... was the most exquisite thing of the evening"; Melissa: "If there was any one outstanding performance ... it was that of ... Davies"; Pitti-Sing: "extraordinarly attractive" and "vivacious"; Phoebe: "delightful verve" and "unaffected pathos"; Tessa: "Davies has me in thrall. ... She has as much charm and grace [as previous Tessas] and a better voice" and "a great deal of comedy intuition". Throughout these years and beyond, Davies enjoyed sport and the out-of-doors, including golf and flat racing, and she also enjoyed dancing, parties and dressing up.

== Later years ==
After Davies left D'Oyly Carte, she married Donald Weir (1900–1959) from Edinburgh, Scotland. Trained as an accountant he had become proprietor of his family's wholesale egg business. Weir met Davies at the stage door after having seen her perform; Joseph surmises that it was at the King's Theatre in Dundee, where the company played in December 1927. Weir was an excellent amateur sportsman, having played for the Scotland national cricket team, an expert golfer and former rugby player. By March 1928 they were engaged, and they married in London on 4 September 1928 at St Martin-in-the-Fields. The rector of the church, Rev. Pat McCormick, performed the ceremony, and as Aileen's father had died, one of her friends from the company, Darrell Fancourt, who had been her stage dad in Yeomen, gave the bride away. The couple honeymooned in France and then settled in Edinburgh.

She began to direct amateur Gilbert and Sullivan productions the following year, first at her husband's alma mater, Edinburgh Academy, where she directed a dozen productions until 1951. The couple had only one child, David, born in September 1829, who became a teacher and, with his second wife, Margaret, ran a preparatory school near Bristol. He attended the Edinburgh Academy and played Sir Despard in Ruddigore under his mother's direction. Davies also directed for adult theatre societies in Great Britain, including once in Belfast, Northern Ireland. Her last production was in 1958. During the Second World War, she joined the Scottish Forces Entertainers, an offshoot of ENSA and sang at army camps in Scotland. Weir was an alcoholic, and their marriage became less and less happy; he was verbally abusive. He died in 1959, and she also became an alcoholic. By the late 1960s, she had become resentful and lonely, though she worked in her seventies as manager of a shop selling kitchen utensils.

She died in her flat in Edinburgh in 1981 at the age of 78.

== Recordings and other media ==
Davies's first recording was of The Mikado, made in 1926 for His Master's Voice (HMV). She sings part of the role of Pitti Sing, while other artists also sing parts of the role. This was the company's first electrical recording. She also appears as Pitti Sing in the D'Oyly Carte's 4-minute long promotional silent film of The Mikado shown in British cinemas in September 1926. She also sings Pitti Sing in the BBC broadcast of 20 September 1926, of two half-hour long excerpts from The Mikado, transmitted live from the stage of the Princes Theatre.

Her only other recording was as Tessa in The Gondoliers (1927), also for HMV.

== Sources ==
- Rollins, Cyril; R. John Witts (1962). The D'Oyly Carte Opera Company in Gilbert and Sullivan Operas: A Record of Productions, 1875–1961. London: Michael Joseph. OCLC 504581419.
- Joseph, Tony (2003). Aileen Davies: 1920s Soubrette. Bristol: Bunthorne Books. ISBN 0950-7992-5-4.
