= J. M. Gordon =

British theatre director, stage manager and actor (1857–1944)

J. M. Gordon

John McRobbie Gordon, né John McRobbie (12 October 1857 – 22 February 1944) was a Scottish singer, actor, stage manager and director, known as an influential stage director of the D'Oyly Carte Opera Company after the death of W. S. Gilbert.

In his early career Gordon appeared in the chorus and minor roles in D'Oyly Carte productions, and after a period as a freelance actor, manager and director, he returned to the company permanently in 1910, as stage manager, and later stage director, establishing a reputation as a firm disciplinarian and upholder of the performing practices originated by Gilbert.

== Life and career ==
=== Early years ===
Gordon was born in Lumphanan, Aberdeenshire, the eldest son of Samuel McRobbie (died 1896), a carpenter and farmer. Gordon retained his Aberdeen accent throughout his life. The family was musical and did not discourage the boy's ambitions for a career as a singer, although they worried that life on the stage would be precarious. Gordon left school early to help his father with carpentry work and, from the age of 17, worked in his cousins' carpentry business in Aberdeen; at the same time he continued to sing in choirs and to take music classes, and he formed a concert party. He studied at the short-lived Aberdeen Conservatoire before moving to London in 1880 to begin his professional singing career.

He took his mother's maiden name as a stage name to avoid embarrassing his more puritanical relatives, who disapproved of the theatre. After some concert-singing experience, Gordon soon joined the touring Grand National Opera Company, playing baritone roles in such works as La Sonnambula and Fra Diavolo. In 1881 he was understudy to the baritone lead in the West End production of Audran's La Mascotte. Further small roles in touring opera companies followed. He also toured in Arthur Wing Pinero's play The Squire. In 1883, while playing Marvejol in Audran's Olivette, he married a fellow member of the company, May Piemonté; the two soon had a son.

Later in 1883 Gordon joined one of the D'Oyly Carte Opera Company touring companies as a member of the chorus in Gilbert and Sullivan's Patience. His first principal role was Mr Wranglebury in Mock Turtles, a one-act curtain raiser. He soon stepped into the part of Colonel Calverley in Patience on the tour. In 1884 Richard D'Oyly Carte saw him perform and offered him the chance to join the main London company at the Savoy Theatre as a chorus member and understudy. Gordon remained a member of the company until 1890, playing Piscator in the curtain raiser The Carp, when it accompanied Ruddigore (1887), and Harrington Jarramie in Mrs. Jarramie's Genie (another curtain raiser), when it accompanied The Yeomen of the Guard (1888). He was in the chorus in the original runs of Princess Ida (1884), The Mikado (1885), Ruddigore, The Yeomen of the Guard and The Gondoliers (1889), and the 1885 revival of Trial by Jury and The Sorcerer at the Savoy. From 1887, Gordon had opportunities to act as stage manager at times.

=== 1890 – 1910 ===
In the 1890s, Gordon managed, and acted in, his own touring company, "The Gordon 'At Home' Party". It comprised variously four or five singers and an accompanist, playing a series of short pieces including Mock Turtles. He also ran his own band. During the winters in the 1890s and through the first decade of the new century, he worked as a freelance conductor and stage director for British amateur operatic societies. Among the works he directed were Sullivan's The Emerald Isle, Planquette's Les cloches de Corneville, Cellier's Dorothy and The Mountebanks, and Gilbert's play Sweethearts, in addition to the Gilbert and Sullivan repertoire.

Throughout his freelance period Gordon maintained his links with D'Oyly Carte, coaching young singers for the touring companies and the Savoy in his spare time. After Carte's death in 1901, Gordon continued to coach singers for Helen Carte after she took over the opera company. In March 1907 he served as stage manager to the D'Oyly Carte touring company. At the Savoy in July of that year, during the D'Oyly Carte's first London repertory season, he directed the revival of Iolanthe.

=== D'Oyly Carte stage manager and director ===
In 1910 Gordon accepted Helen Carte's offer of a permanent position as stage manager to the company, and he gave up his freelance activities. She implored him to make sure that the touring company was performing the operas as the authors intended. Gilbert died in 1911, and Helen Carte died two years later. The opera company was inherited by her stepson, Rupert D'Oyly Carte, who continued Gordon's employment with the company. Like his stepmother, Rupert D'Oyly Carte needed a stage manager who would maintain the company's production standards and preserve Gilbert's traditions and style. Gordon's skills, attention to detail and tenacity, together with his experience with the company under Gilbert's direction, were what Carte required. One of Carte's early priorities, when he inherited the company, was to arrive at an authorised text. Over the years Gilbert had tweaked his libretti, removing out-of-date references and adding new ones. He had also permitted a few interpolations by senior members of the company. Gordon, whose close contacts with Gilbert had included work on the prompt books for the Savoy operas, was entrusted with preparing an authoritative set of libretti. In general, he retained the few "gags" that Gilbert had approved, and otherwise returned to the original 1870s and '80s texts. (Note: "Gags" approved by Gilbert and retained by Gordon included Pooh-Bah's "No money – no grovel!" and Nanki-Poo's "Modified rapture!" in The Mikado. Examples of Gordon’s removal of Gilbert's own updatings included reverting from "a tuppenny tube young man" to the original "a threepenny bus young man" in Patience.)

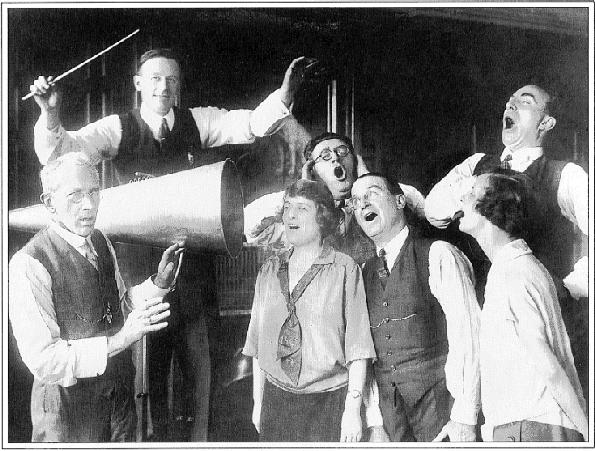
(l to r) Gordon, Norris, Winifred Lawson, Leo Sheffield, Henry Lytton, Eileen Sharp and Darrell Fancourt – publicity shot for Princess Ida, 1924

Gordon stage managed and then directed D'Oyly Carte productions for twenty-nine years. He coached new artists on the blocking, dances, and line readings for each part, and maintained strict quality control over the productions. He was named stage director for the company in 1922 and served in that capacity for seventeen years. When The Sorcerer was revived in 1916 after a long absence from the company's repertory, Gordon directed the production. In consultation with Rupert D'Oyly Carte, he was responsible for making major textual revisions to Ruddigore when it was revived, for the first time, in December 1921. Around the same time, he worked with the company's musical director, Harry Norris, to create the radically shortened "Savoy Edition" of Cox and Box, and he approved any changes to stage business, such as Darrell Fancourt's introduction of the Mikado's famous laugh. His relations with Malcolm Sargent, whom Carte brought in to conduct London seasons in 1926 and 1929–30, were less harmonious. Sargent's brisk tempos upset Gordon, who protested unavailingly that they interfered with the pacing of the stage action. Some senior company members agreed with Gordon, but Carte backed Sargent.

Gordon retired in July 1939, but briefly came out of retirement in late 1939 and early 1940 to coach Grahame Clifford, who had taken over at short notice from Martyn Green as principal comedian. Gordon was a vegetarian and an instructor with the Thames Iron Works Amateur Dramatic Society. Through this society, he met Arnold Hills, a promoter of vegetarianism, who asked him to form a company to supply entertainment at vegetarian meetings. Gordon died at his home in Brighton at the age of 87 after a fall in the wartime blackout. His only surviving daughter, Lily, preserved many of his papers with information about the company's productions. His memoirs, written after his retirement, were edited by his great-niece Elizabeth Benney and published by Pitcairn-Knowles in 2014.

== Reputation ==
Many members of D'Oyly Carte wrote anecdotes about Gordon's dedication and the value of his instruction. Derek Oldham described him as:

a tiger for knowing and getting what he wanted! He was only really happy when he was rehearsing. He loved rehearsing. ... He was the everlasting secret joke of the Company ... and there were some funny tales. ... But he had that company on its toes. It is sometimes said that the vintage years of [the company] were from 1919 and the six years following. Well, they were all due to old man Gordon. … Later, as he became older and tired, it showed itself in the fact that he was not so flexible. He became a martinet in tiny little things of "business" and tradition, and would not allow the individuality of the actor to colour a part, as he used to in my time ... making for a dull uniformity. But what a producer when at his best. ... Gordon gave me diction, much solid stage technique, and nursed the passion and sincerity for my job.

Viola Wilson, who was a soprano with the company near the end of Gordon's career, wrote this description in her memoir:

He worshipped Gilbert and this was reflected in his own productions. Although a stickler for tradition, he believed first and foremost in building up an intelligent performance. Short and slight, James Gordon kept a small step ladder [to see over the heads of the chorus] near the prompt corner so he could stand on it, peer through his pince-nez spectacles at us and not miss a single movement. He knew the exact spot where we should stand and no one dared be half an inch out of place. From the stage we could see his luminous pen jotting down notes which he later handed to us. Some of these I still have: "You took three steps too close to Strephon during the duet." "Keep your arms steady during song and sing with more feeling" and so on.

== Notes, references and sources ==
=== Sources ===
- Forward, Charles W. (1898). Fifty Years of Food Reform: A History of the Vegetarian Movement in England. London: Ideal Publishing Union.
- Gordon, J. M. (2014). The Memoirs of J M Gordon 1856–1944: Stage Director D'Oyly Carte Opera Company. Elizabeth Benney (ed). Tunbridge Wells: Richard Pitcairn-Knowles. ISBN 978-0-9558591-4-4.
- Green, Martyn (1961). Martyn Green's Treasury of Gilbert & Sullivan. London: Michael Joseph. OCLC 974331284.
- Joseph, Tony (1994). The D'Oyly Carte Opera Company, 1875–1982: An Unofficial History. London: Bunthorne Books. ISBN 978-0-9507992-1-6
- Reid, Charles (1968). Malcolm Sargent: a biography. London: Hamish Hamilton Ltd. ISBN 978-0-241-91316-1.
- Rollins, Cyril; R. John Witts (1962). The D'Oyly Carte Opera Company in Gilbert and Sullivan Operas: A Record of Productions, 1875–1961. London: Michael Joseph. OCLC 504581419.
