= Harry Norris (conductor) =

New Zealand-born conductor

Harry Norris

Henry William Claudius Norris (23 November 1887 – 22 June 1979) was a New Zealand-born conductor best remembered as musical director of the D'Oyly Carte Opera Company from 1920 to 1929.

Trained at the Royal Academy of Music, Norris joined the D'Oyly Carte Opera Company in 1913 as chorus coach and principal violinist. In 1916, he left to serve in World War I, but In 1919 he returned to the company, becoming musical director in 1920. However, the company recalled Geoffrey Toye, Norris's predecessor, as musical director for the company's London seasons. During his tenure, Norris led the company's tours both in Britain and abroad. He is remembered for making modifications to Arthur Sullivan's scores, some of which were performed and recorded by the company for many years. His short edition of Cox and Box remains popular.

After leaving the D'Oyly Carte Opera Company in 1929, Norris emigrated to Canada with his wife to teach at McGill University in Montreal. He resigned from this post in 1933, and his wife and he became engaged full-time in, respectively, directing and music directing Gilbert and Sullivan productions for several groups. They helped to establish one of these Gilbert and Sullivan companies and directed it from 1939 to 1963. He also performed on the violin and gave violin and singing lessons, among other activities. They retired and returned to England in the 1960s.

== Life and career ==
Norris was born in Invercargill, in the southernmost part of New Zealand, the first child of four born to William and Mary Norris. He displayed talent for the violin and piano, and at the age of about 3-1/2 began tuition on these instruments with his music teacher father. At age 11 he had outstripped his father's teaching capabilities for the violin and continued on to the advanced stages of training on his own, aided by the playing instructions in the British in the British magazine The Strad. He played the violin frequently at concerts in Invercargill. In 1907 he passed the Royal Schools of Music Licentiate examination with such high marks that he was awarded a scholarship to study in London at the Royal Academy of Music, where he won the Hill Prize for violin, among other prizes. At this time he was known as "Henry W Norris". A fellow student was the future D'Oyly Carte star Darrell Fancourt.

=== D'Oyly Carte years ===
In 1913 the conductor Landon Ronald, responding to a request from Rupert D'Oyly Carte, recommended Norris as chorus coach and principal violinist for the D'Oyly Carte Opera Company. 1n 1916, he left to serve in World War I as a musketry trainer and also forming and training orchestras and other musical groups for the forces. After his discharge, he returned in 1919 as chorus coach and principal violinist in a new D'Oyly Carte touring company. In January 1920, he moved to the main company during the London season at the Prince's Theatre, where he served as assistant musical director to Geoffrey Toye for the remainder of that season. On the expiry of Toye's contract he took over as musical director from 1 February 1920, making his debut as conductor in Birmingham the following day.

Norris was the company's musical director from February 1920 to May 1929, except for the London West End seasons in 1921–22 and 1924, when Toye again took charge, and 1926 when Malcolm Sargent was guest conductor. Norris was never musical director for a D'Oyly Carte London season, though he shared the conducting and was allotted the occasional first night of an opera's run. During his tenure with the company, Norris married and divorced one of the company's sopranos, Elsie Coram. From January to May 1927, Norris toured Canada with the company, and from September 1928 to May 1929 they toured Canada and the US. Norris left the company at the end of that tour.

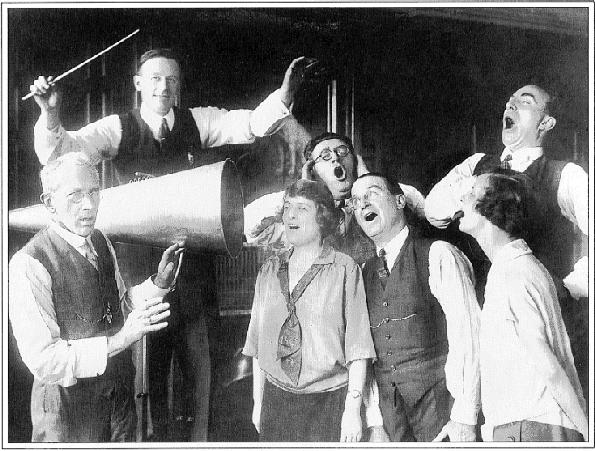
Left to right: Gordon, Norris, Lawson, Sheffield, Lytton, Eileen Sharp and Fancourt – publicity shot, c. 1924

As musical director, Norris was responsible for a number of changes to Sullivan's scores. Prominent horn parts were added to the accompaniment to "A Lady Fair" in Princess Ida that are customarily referred to as the "Norris" horn parts, though they may have been written by Toye. They were expunged by Sargent but subsequently restored by the D'Oyly Carte musical director Royston Nash in the 1970s. In addition, in 1921 Norris, in collaboration with stage director J. M. Gordon, cut Cox and Box from its original one-hour running time to play in about half an hour, so that it became suitable as a curtain raiser for The Sorcerer or other shorter full-length pieces. This version remained in the company's repertoire until 1977 and continues to be used in many productions.

Of Norris's work with the D'Oyly Carte company, Samuel Langford in The Manchester Guardian wrote, "Mr Norris, the conductor, we think favours too much in The Mikado an easeful enthusiasm. The work on the stage would be all the finer with a keener precision in the orchestra." Earlier, Langford objected to "the occasions when the accompanying melodies took rather a canonic than a simultaneous form." The Times, on the other hand, praised Norris's "admirable swing and fluency" and commented that he justified D'Oyly Carte's confidence in him."

=== Later years ===
After leaving the company in 1929, Norris settled in Canada with his second wife, Doris Hemingway (also a former D'Oyly Carte performer), taking up an academic appointment at McGill University in Montreal. He played the viola in the McGill Quartet with university colleagues. He resigned from this post in 1933. Almost immediately after their arrival the Norrises were in great demand as musical and stage directors, respectively, for several amateur Gilbert and Sullivan Operatic Societies, and this, along with teaching piano, singing and violin, became their life's work for the next 34 years. As a soloist, Norris gave violin recitals, and in 1935 he became an original member of what is now known as the Montreal Symphony Orchestra. Their son, Peter, was born in 1937.

The Norrises were founding members of the Montreal West Operatic Society, in 1939, which performed the Gilbert and Sullivan operas, directing for them until 1963. The group was highly praised by newspaper critics. They also worked with St. Paul's Operatic Society in Lachine, Quebec, a western suburb of Montreal, among other groups. While at McGill, Norris had been invited to form an experimental orchestra of secondary school students, and this work successfully expanded until by 1939 he was made Director of Instrumental Studies in the Orchestral Scheme of the Protestant Board of School Commissioners of the City of Montreal. He also became musical director for the Montreal West United Church of Canada. Norris volunteered at St. Helen's School, Dunham, Quebec, in the 1940s and 1950s. He rehearsed and directed the school's annual carol service at St. Matthias and directed an annual spring production of a Gilbert and Sullivan opera. He also gave lessons to the school's advanced piano and singing students.

He retired in 1963, and he and Doris moved to Barton-on-Sea near Bournemouth, England. They returned to Montreal in 1967–68 for Doris to satisfy requirements for her to receive the Canadian Old Age Security pension. During this period, St Paul's Operatic Society invited them back to direct two productions. They then returned to England and settled permanently in Barton-on-Sea.

Norris died in 1979 at the age of 91, and Doris died in 1983, aged 82.

== Recordings ==
For His Master's Voice, Norris conducted D'Oyly Carte recordings of:

- Iolanthe (1922, conducted part of the recording)
- H.M.S. Pinafore (1923, part)
- Ruddigore (1924)
- Princess Ida (1924)
- The Mikado (1926)
- The Gondoliers (1927); and
- Trial by Jury (1928)

The first four were recorded by the old acoustic process. A photograph of Norris and D'Oyly Carte colleagues with the huge recording horn used in the acoustic process can be seen here. The other three were recorded by the new electrical technique, though it can be clearly heard that in the electrical recordings Norris retained some of the orchestral augmentations (e.g. low brass playing lines written for low strings) used for acoustic recordings.
