= LLO =

LLO may refer to:

- Lakeshore Light Opera
- Lateral line organ
- Lebanese Liberation Organization
- Lipid-linked oligosaccharide
- Listeriolysin O
- Logical line of operation
- Low lunar orbit
- Bua Airport, by IATA code

== See also ==
- Llo
