= Lakeshore Light Opera =

Canadian amateur theatre group

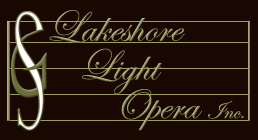
- Formation: 1955
- Type: Theatre group
- Purpose: Perform Gilbert and Sullivan works
- Location: Pointe-Claire, Quebec, Canada
- Website: llo.org

Lakeshore Light Opera (LLO) is an amateur community theatre group that performs Gilbert and Sullivan operas in Pointe-Claire, Quebec, Canada. The company produced its first show in 1955. Early in its history, the group was directed by former D'Oyly Carte Opera Company member Doris Hemingway, and briefly conducted by her husband, former D'Oyly Carte conductor Harry Norris. The group was known as St Paul's Operatic Society until 1980, when it changed its name to Lakeshore Light Opera. For over 35 years, proceeds from its annual production have been contributed to the Lakeshore General Hospital.

== History ==
=== Early years ===
In 1955, a few members of the Men's Club of St. Paul's Anglican Church in Lachine, Quebec, in conjunction with the church choir, presented Gilbert and Sullivan's Trial by Jury in Montreal. The production led to the creation of a permanent operatic society dedicated to productions of Gilbert and Sullivan operas in the traditional style. In 1957, St Paul's Operatic Society was formed. Its first Music Director was Arthur Gough, the church organist, and the first Stage Director was Doris Hemingway, formerly of the D'Oyly Carte Opera Company. She and her husband, music director Harry Norris, a former D'Oyly Carte conductor, were already well known to Montreal Gilbert and Sullivan audiences through their association with the Lyric Opera Company, Montreal West Operatic Society and various other musical groups. In 1972, the society was incorporated as a non-profit corporation under the name of St. Paul's Operatic Society Inc.

In 1965, Leonard Langmead became stage director of the St. Paul's Operatic Society and served as stage director for nearly 35 years. Marian Siminski has been the company's music director since 1984.

=== Later years ===
The Gondoliers (2023) (2:21:11)
Video of the company's 2023 production of The Gondoliers

In 1980, after the dissolution of ties with St. Paul’s Church, the name of the company was changed to Lakeshore Light Opera Inc. – La Société d'Opérette Lakeshore Inc. For over 35 years, proceeds from the annual production have been contr, 2009ibuted to the Lakeshore General Hospital, through the Lakeshore General Hospital Foundation. The annual donations, reaching as high as $171,000, are used by the Hospital to purchase equipment not covered by its budget or by Provincial grants.

In 2005, LLO celebrated its 50th anniversary with a production of The Pirates of Penzance together with Trial by Jury, and since then it has continued to produce the Savoy operas. In 2015, LLO celebrated its 60th anniversary with another production of Pirates. In 2017 Lakeshore Light Opera was awarded the Lakeshore General Hospital Foundation's humanitarian award for its contributions to the foundation over the years. Two years later it won the Montreal English Theatre Award. Later stage directors have included Colleen St-James and Fred Gagnon (2018) and Coralie Heiler (2025).

In 2025, LLO celebrated its 70th anniversary, again with a production of Pirates, raising $12,000 for the Lakeshore Hospital Foundation.

== Theatre and membership ==
Lakeshore Light Opera performs at the Louise Chalmers Theatre at John Rennie High School, in Pointe-Claire, Quebec.

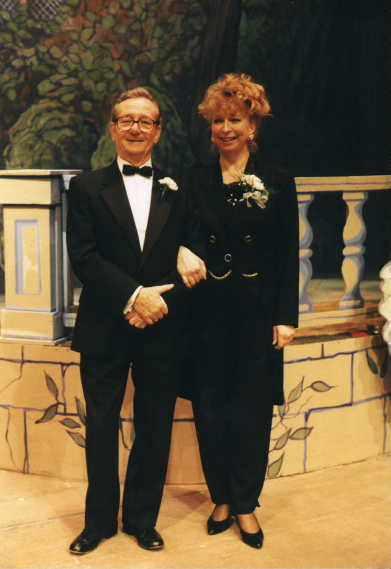
Leonard Langmead and Marian Siminski in 2005

All actors, crew, ushers, front of house people and board members are volunteers. The members of the company span a wide range of ages.

== Past productions ==
- 1955 – Trial by Jury
- 1957 – The Sorcerer
- 1958 – H.M.S. Pinafore
- 1959 – The Pirates of Penzance
- 1960 – The Mikado
- 1961 – Patience
- 1962 – Iolanthe
- 1963 – The Yeomen of the Guard
- 1964 – The Gondoliers
- 1965 – The Mikado
- 1966 – Ruddigore
- 1967 – The Pirates of Penzance
- 1968 – H.M.S. Pinafore
- 1969 – Merrie England
- 1970 – The Geisha
- 1971 – The Gondoliers
- 1972 – Iolanthe
- 1973 – The Yeomen of the Guard
- 1974 – The Pirates of Penzance
- 1975 – Patience
- 1976 – The Mikado
- 1977 – Trial by Jury / H.M.S. Pinafore
- 1978 – The Gondoliers
- 1979 – Princess Ida
- 1980 – Iolanthe
- 1981 – Ruddigore
- 1982 – The Pirates of Penzance
- 1983 – The Mikado
- 1984 – The Yeomen of the Guard
- 1985 – Cox & Box / H.M.S. Pinafore
- 1986 – The Gondoliers
- 1987 – Patience
- 1988 – Ruddigore
- 1989 – The Pirates of Penzance
- 1990 – Princess Ida
- 1991 – Iolanthe
- 1992 – The Mikado
- 1993 – The Yeomen of the Guard
- 1994 – The Gondoliers
- 1995 – Trial by Jury & H.M.S. Pinafore
- 1996 – The Pirates of Penzance
- 1997 – Patience
- 1998 – Ruddigore
- 1999 – The Mikado
- 2000 – Iolanthe
- 2001 – Princess Ida
- 2002 – The Gondoliers
- 2003 – The Yeomen of the Guard
- 2004 – H.M.S. Pinafore
- 2005 – Trial by Jury / Pirates of Penzance
- 2006 – Patience
- 2007 – The Mikado
- 2008 – Ruddigore
- 2009 – The Gondoliers
- 2010 – Iolanthe
- 2011 – The Sorcerer
- 2012 – H.M.S. Pinafore / Cox & Box
- 2013 – Princess Ida
- 2014 – The Yeomen of the Guard
- 2015 – The Pirates of Penzance
- 2016 – Patience
- 2017 – Ruddigore
- 2018 – The Mikado
- 2019 – Thespis
- 2020 – Iolanthe
- 2021–2022 – No production, due to Covid
- 2023 – The Gondoliers
- 2024 – The Grand Duke
- 2025 – The Pirates of Penzance
- 2026 – H.M.S. Pinafore and Trial by Jury
