= Donald Weir =

Scottish cricketer and field hockey player

Personal information
- Full name: Donald St Clair Weir
- Born: 23 January 1900; Edinburgh, Midlothian, Scotland
- Died: 1 April 1959 (aged 59); Edinburgh, Midlothian, Scotland
- Batting: Right-handed
- Bowling: Right-arm medium

Domestic team information
- Years: Team
- 1923–1926: Scotland

Career statistics
Competition	First-class
Matches	4
Runs scored	64
Batting average	9.14
100s/50s	–/–
Top score	28
Balls bowled	438
Wickets	5
Bowling average	61.20
5 wickets in innings	–
10 wickets in match	–
Best bowling	2/63
Catches/stumpings	3/–
- Source: Cricinfo, 7 July 2022

Donald St Clair Weir (23 January 1900 – 1 April 1959) was a Scottish first-class cricketer and cricket administrator.

Weir was at Edinburgh in January 1900. He was educated at the Edinburgh Academy. A club cricketer for Edinburgh Academical Cricket Club, Weir made his debut for Scotland in first-class cricket against Middlesex at Edinburgh in 1923. He made three further first-class appearances for Scotland, against Wales at Swansea in 1924, and twice against Ireland in 1925 and 1926. He scored 64 runs in his four matches at an average of 9.14, with a highest score of 28. With his right-arm medium pace bowling, he took 5 wickets with best figures of 2 for 63. He later served as president of the Scottish Cricket Union in 1951.

Outside of cricket, Weir was an accountant and later served as proprietor of his family's wholesale egg business. He was married in 1928 at the St. Martin-in-the-Fields, London, to Aileen Davies, formerly the principal mezzo-soprano artiste with the D'Oyly Carte Opera Company. Weir became an alcoholic and was a heavy smoker; he died at Edinburgh in April 1959.

== Sources ==
- Joseph, Tony (2003). Aileen Davies: 1920s Soubrette. Bristol: Bunthorne Books. ISBN 0950-7992-5-4.
