= Darrell Fancourt =

British opera singer and actor

Fancourt circa 1920

Darrell Louis Fancourt Leverson OBE (8 March 1886 – 29 August 1953), known as Darrell Fancourt, was an English bass-baritone and actor, known for his performances and recordings of the Savoy operas.

After a brief concert career, Fancourt joined the D'Oyly Carte Opera Company, where he starred in more than 10,000 performances over a 33-year period until his death. He regularly played about ten different roles for the company over these years, including the Pirate King in The Pirates of Penzance, Dick Deadeye in H.M.S. Pinafore, and the title character in The Mikado, which he played more than 3,000 times. Fancourt was famous for his melodramatic style, creating the controversial Mikado laugh that was later adopted by some of his successors. His performances are preserved in nineteen of the company's recordings made between 1923 and 1950.

== Early years ==
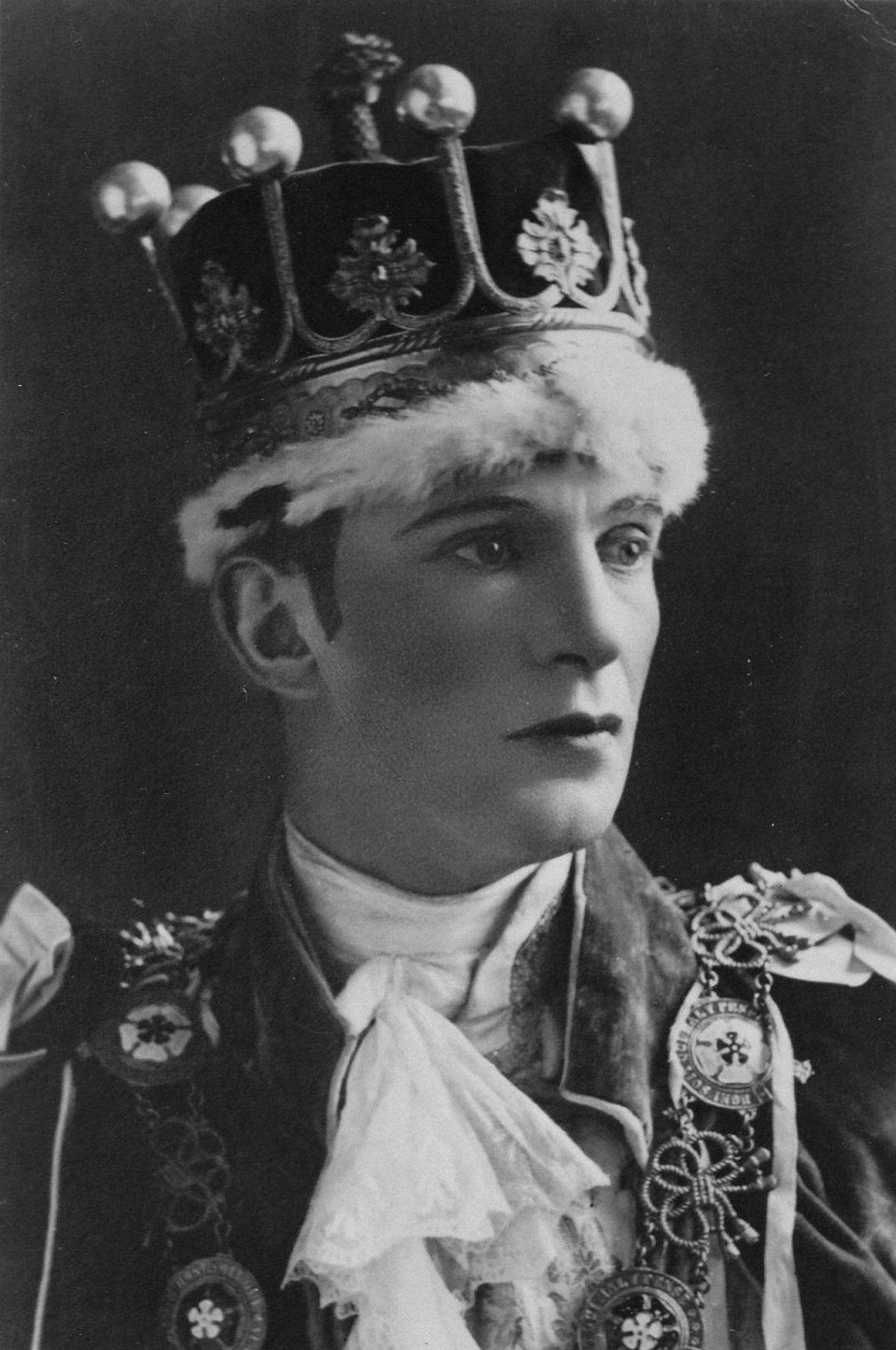
Fancourt as Lord Mountararat in Iolanthe

Fancourt was born Darrell Louis Fancourt Leverson, the younger son of three children of a Jewish family in Kensington, London. His father, Louis George Leverson (1860–1909), was a diamond merchant who had made a fortune in South Africa. His mother, Amelia (Amy) de Symons, née Lewis-Barned (1865–1931), was "a clever vivacious young artist of the musical comedy type". Both were staunch friends of the arts. His father's sister married Brandon Thomas. Fancourt was baptised into the Church of England when he was fourteen years old.

Fancourt was educated at Bedford School and with a private tutor in Germany. He continued his vocal studies in Germany with Lilli Lehmann. Upon his return to England, he won a scholarship to the Royal Academy of Music. At the Royal Academy, he studied singing with his mother's former teacher, Sir Henry Wood, and Alberto Randegger, and drama with Richard Temple, creator of many of the Savoy roles in which Fancourt was later famous. While a student, Fancourt performed in opera productions at the Academy, creating the role of Tackleton, the toy merchant, in Alexander Mackenzie's opera The Cricket on the Hearth, and playing Colas in Mozart's Bastien und Bastienne, and Benoit in La bohème. The Times thought him "amusing but not noticeably musical" in the last.

Even before completing his studies, Fancourt was building a concert career in London, the British provinces and the European continent. The Times said of an Aeolian Hall recital in 1912, "Mr. Fancourt has some noble notes in his voice, except when he forces it occasionally ... Schubert's Tod und das Mädchen was remarkably well characterized; it was quite his best and he made it into a thing of great beauty." In World War I, Fancourt volunteered for military service and was commissioned in the London Regiment as a lieutenant. In 1917, while still serving in the army, Fancourt married a beautiful Welsh singer, Eleanor Evans, at St Mark's Church, Hamilton Terrace, London. She had been a fellow student at the Royal Academy. After returning to civilian life in 1919, Fancourt sang in a single performance of Prince Igor in Sir Thomas Beecham's opera season at Covent Garden as Prince Galitsky under the baton of Albert Coates. This was his only professional appearance in a grand opera, and his only paid acting experience up to that point. In the same year, he appeared as a soloist at the Henry Wood Promenade Concerts and in oratorio elsewhere in London.

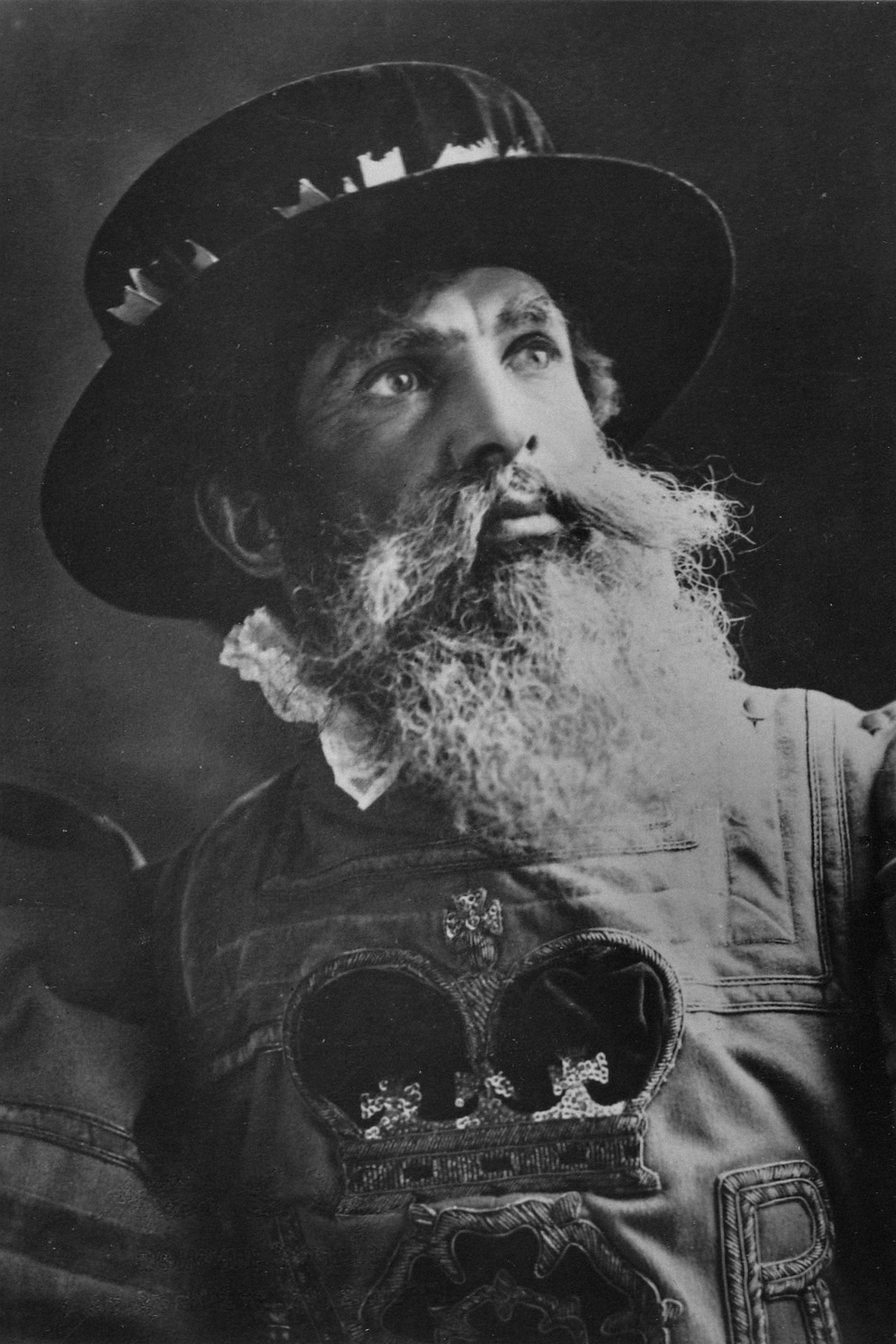
Fancourt as Sergeant Meryll in The Yeomen of the Guard

Fancourt joined the D'Oyly Carte Opera Company in May 1920 to succeed Frederick Hobbs, who had announced his decision to leave the company. Fancourt went on for Hobbs as Mountararat in Iolanthe, Arac in Princess Ida and the title character in The Mikado. In June 1920, Hobbs left, and Fancourt took over the bass-baritone roles, including the above parts, Dick Deadeye in H.M.S. Pinafore, the Pirate King in The Pirates of Penzance, Colonel Calverley in Patience, Sir Roderic Murgatroyd in Ruddigore and Sergeant Meryll in The Yeomen of the Guard. In 1921, when Cox and Box and The Sorcerer were revived, Fancourt added the roles of Sergeant Bouncer and Sir Marmaduke Pointdextre to his repertoire. He also appeared as the Usher in Trial by Jury in 1926, but he thought himself "simply bloody" in the role and soon dropped it. In 1921, his wife, Eleanor Evans, joined the company as a chorister, also playing some smaller principal soprano roles. She was nicknamed "Snookie" in the company; and, according to fellow D'Oyly Carte performer Derek Oldham, "she was so beautiful, was Snookie! We all fell for her, and we gave Darrell a busy time keeping us 'off'." Later in Fancourt's career, his wife was made the company's stage director and director of productions.

== Later years ==
When the night wind howls
"When the night wind howls" sung by Darrell Fancourt (Sir Roderic) with chorus, 1924.

Fancourt continued to play most of the principal bass-baritone roles for D'Oyly Carte until 1953. The company performed almost year-round in repertory during these 33 years, and Fancourt appeared in well over 10,000 performances; he played the title role in The Mikado more than 3,000 times. Over the years, he performed with the company on seven tours in North America. Known for his excellent diction and vocal technique, Fancourt was an audience favourite during his long tenure. "Not only does he possess a velvety resonant bass tone but also has a relaxed vibrato that is particularly elegant." J. C. Trewin called Fancourt "the lord of Gilbert-and-Sullivan playing. ... Fancourt is both a fine singer and, within the Savoy convention, a fine and zestful actor with the gift of a dominating personality. Roderic's song 'When the night wind howls', as Fancourt sings it in the second act of Ruddigore, is at the meridian of that opera and one of the glories of Gilbert-and-Sullivan in the contemporary theatre." The Times later said, "nobody who heard it will ever forget his singing of 'When the night wind howls'."

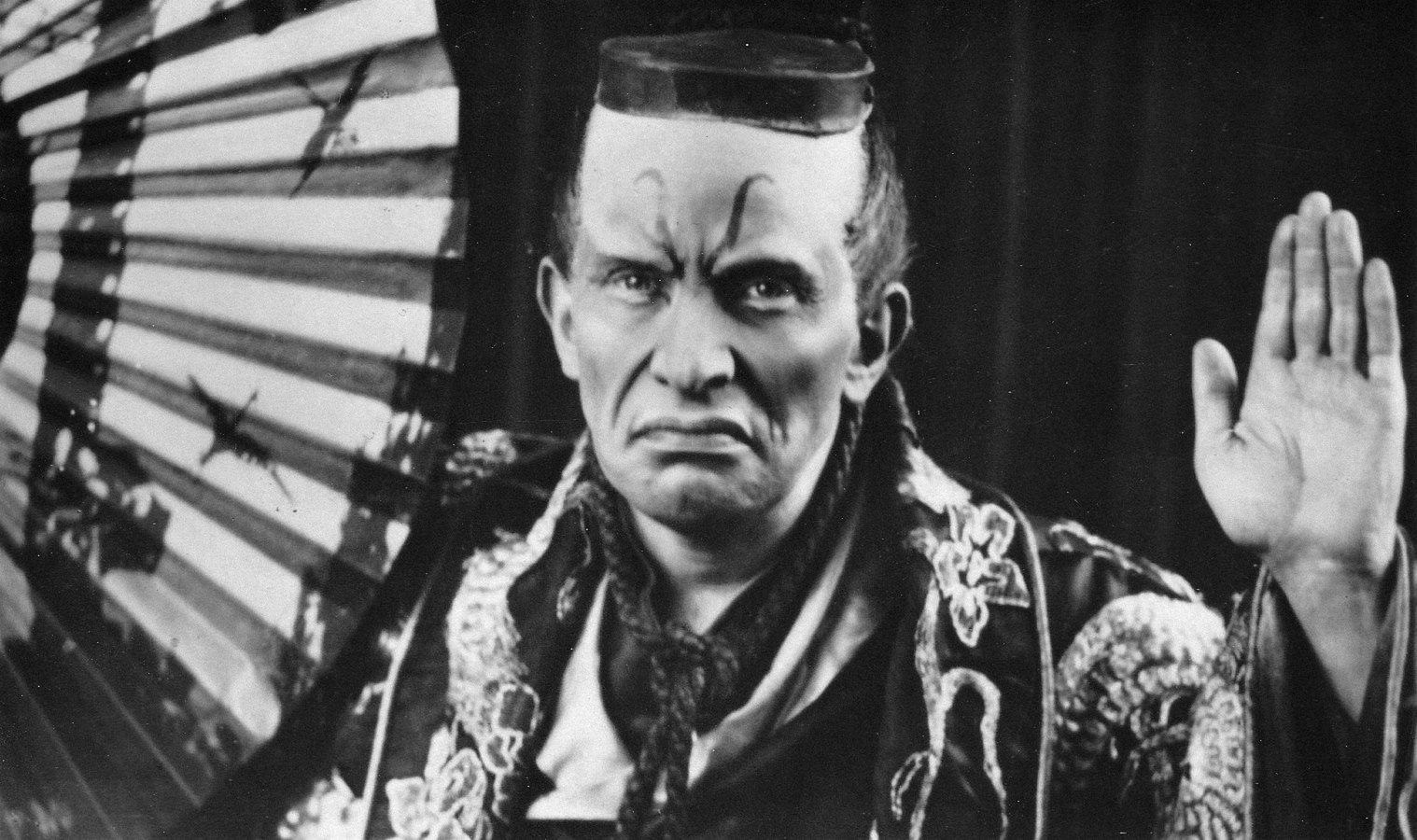
Fancourt as the Mikado

Opinions differed about Fancourt's melodramatic style in his roles, especially his interpretation of his best-known role, that of the Mikado of Japan, and his famous Mikado laugh. Frederic Lloyd, who joined the D'Oyly Carte in 1951 and had studied the company's history, told an interviewer that Fancourt invented his interpretation, concerned that the earlier movements used during the Mikado's song could be taken as a Fagin-like caricature. According to Lloyd, Fancourt had said that, because of his Jewish background, "I just couldn't go through those movements, it would bother me", and Lloyd reported that, when Fancourt showed Rupert D'Oyly Carte and his stage director J. M. Gordon his new business for the song, they were delighted. Jessie Bond, who had played Pitti-Sing in the 1885 première, was unimpressed: "Who, I want to know, intended that the Mikado should prance about like a madman, hissing out his lines like a serpent? ... The raving monster we so often see now is not one bit like the suave and oily Mikado created [by Fancourt's teacher, Richard Temple] at the Savoy." The Times thought that he "undoubtedly loses a good deal of the Mikado's humour... his 'humane Mikado' scene is the one which seems to have travelled farthest from the 'Savoy tradition'." A later Times review commented more favourably: "Mr Darrell Fancourt... can (and did) add a terrifying aspect to the benignity of his humaner punishment manifesto, and left us wondering how his vocal cords ever managed to function normally after those expressions of emphasis with which he punctuated its paragraphs." The Manchester Guardian praised Fancourt's fresh approach and added, "He makes more of the punishment-fitting-the-crime song than we can remember having seen from any other actor." The Pall Mall Gazette said, "Mr Fancourt has recognised that people can do with a 'thrill' in these Grand Guignol days. So he has given us a Mikado who really does curdle the blood, with a voice like a steam hammer slowly crushing a ton of Brazil nuts, and a make up of ghastly villainy, and a fiendish, gurgling laugh, which must be heard to be appreciated." Another critic described the sound of Fancourt's laugh as "a dragon getting up steam". With respect to Fancourt's portrayal of the Pirate King, fellow actor Henry Lytton told an interviewer, "The King should be a story book pirate, not a real one and blood thirsty to boot. But that's the way Mr. Fancourt plays it".

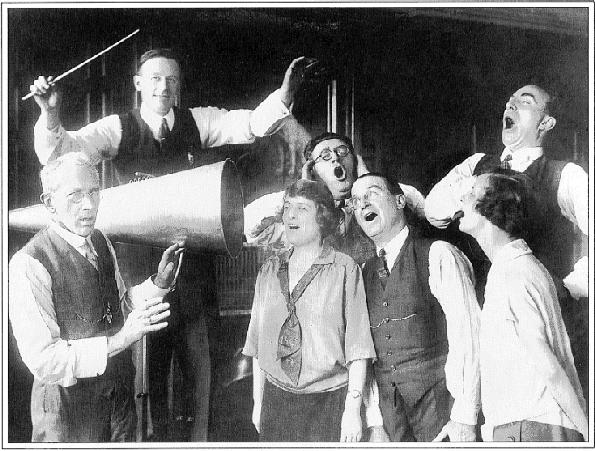
(l to r) J. M. Gordon, Norris, Winifred Lawson, Leo Sheffield, Henry Lytton, Eileen Sharp and Fancourt – publicity shot for Princess Ida, 1924

Fancourt was a cricket fan, an avid golfer and a fine bridge player and was popular among his colleagues. By the late 1940s, his health began to fail, and in 1950 he gave up the role of Mountararat. In his last year, he continued to perform although he was very ill. Fancourt received the OBE in June 1953 in the Coronation Honours shortly after announcing his forthcoming retirement. The Illustrated London News commented, "He will be the greatest loss to professional Gilbert-and-Sullivan since Henry Lytton retired … Besides his voice and presence, he has the priceless gift of attack. To watch him attacking The Mikado is to watch high tide flooding across the beach: it is an irresistible surge and swell." Fancourt was too ill to make his scheduled final appearance, and as a last gesture he asked a friend to take his make-up to his successor, Donald Adams.

Fancourt died in August 1953 at the age of 67, 33 days after giving his last performance.

== Recordings ==
Fancourt participated in nineteen D'Oyly Carte recordings between 1923 and 1950 in the following roles: Mountararat (1922, shared with Peter Dawson, and 1930), Dick Deadeye (1922, shared with Frederick Hobbs, 1930 and 1949), Sir Roderic (1924, 1931 and 1950), Arac (1925 and 1932), Colonel Calverley (1930 and 1952), Sir Marmaduke in an abridged Sorcerer (1933), the Mikado (1926, 1936 and 1950), the Pirate King (1931 abridged set and 1950), and Sergeant Meryll (1950). He also sang the title role in a 1926 BBC radio broadcast of The Mikado and appeared in a four-minute silent promotional film made of the D'Oyly Carte Mikado in 1926.
