= Leo Sheffield =

British opera singer and actor (1873–1951)

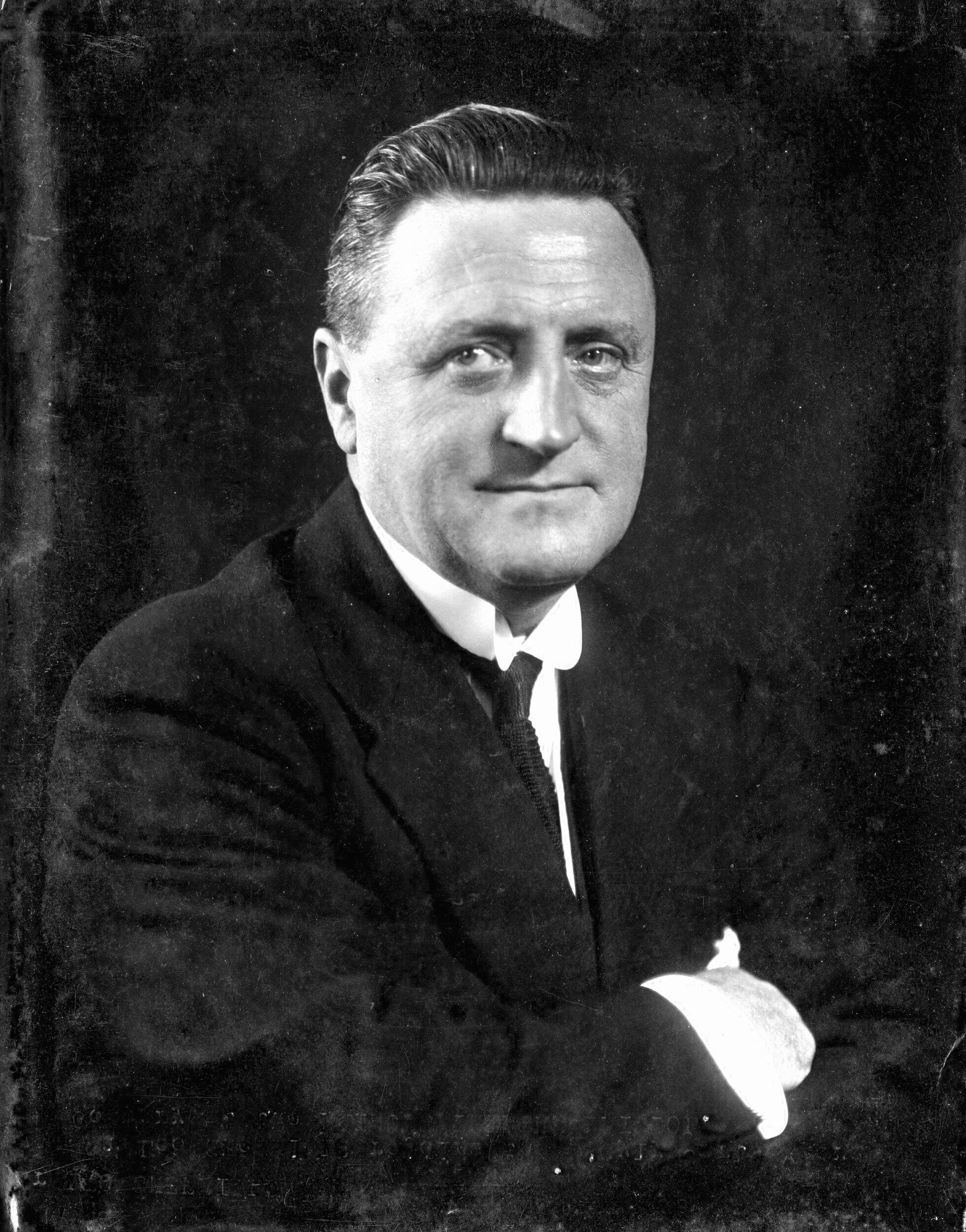
Sheffield in 1915

Leo Sheffield (15 November 1873 – 3 September 1951), born Arthur Leo Wilson, was an English singer and actor best known for his performances in baritone roles of the Savoy Operas with the D'Oyly Carte Opera Company.

He made his first stage appearances under the direction of W. S. Gilbert in 1906, remaining with the D'Oyly Carte company for three years. After touring in musical theatre for the next five years with other managements, he rejoined D'Oyly Carte from 1915 to 1928 in the principal baritone roles, appearing in London seasons and on tour in Britain and, in one of his last seasons, Canada. He recorded many of these roles.

After leaving D'Oyly Carte, Sheffield worked in a wide variety of theatre, including musical comedy, straight plays, pantomime, and in radio and films. He continued to tour during the Second World War while in his seventies.

== Life and career ==
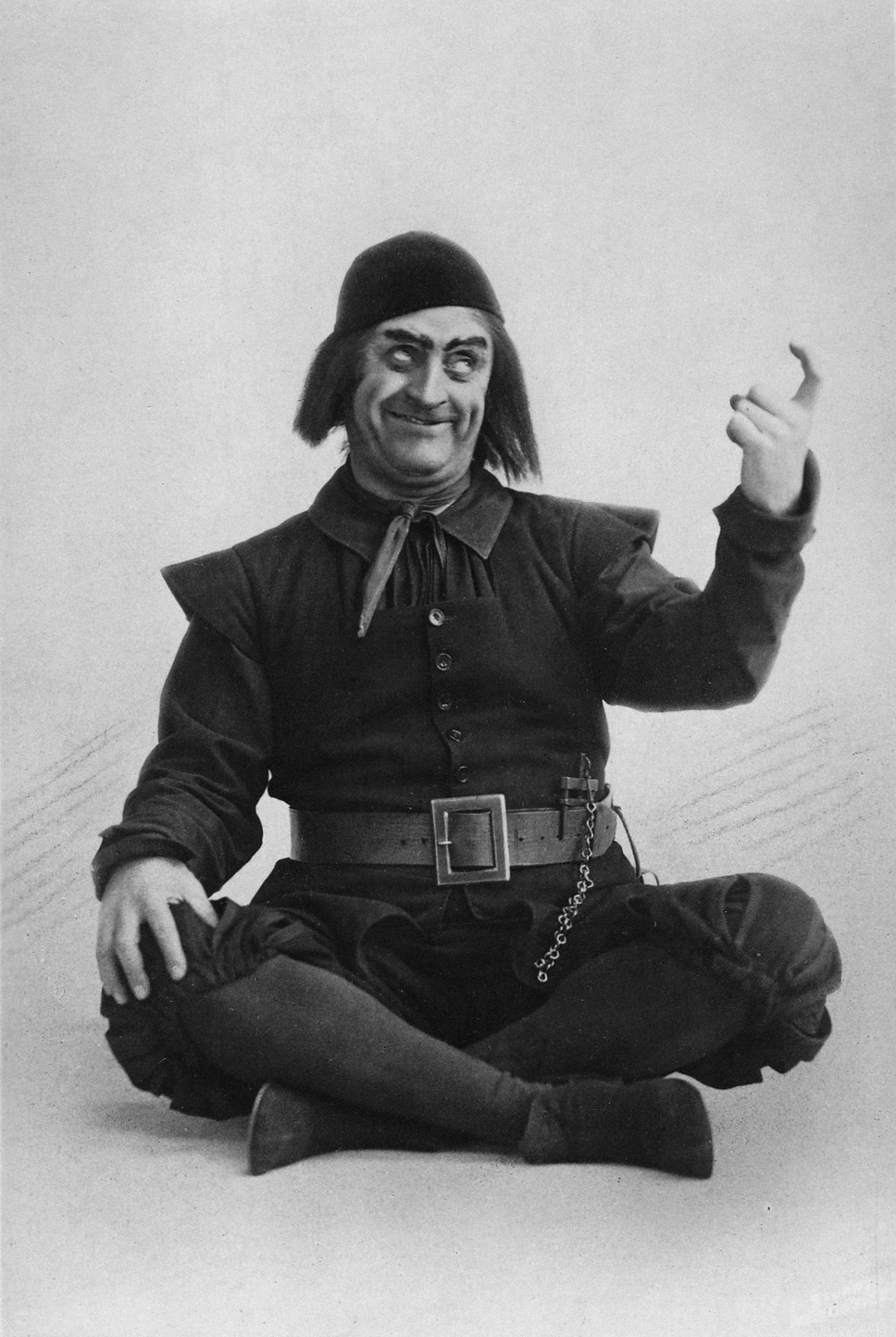
Sheffield as Wilfred Shadbolt

=== Early years ===
Sheffield was born Arthur Leo Wilson to James Walker Wilson (1839–1907), a painter and later a vocalist, and Alice (née Sheffield) (1844–1911). His brothers, Edward Sheffield Wilson (1864–1903) and Robert Thorpe Wilson (1866–1908) appeared under the stage names Wilson and Thorpe Sheffield with the D'Oyly Carte Opera Company in the 1890s. and raised in Malton, Yorkshire.

Sheffield joined D'Oyly Carte in 1906, appearing at the Savoy Theatre under the direction of W. S. Gilbert in the first repertory season of Savoy Operas. During this season, he played the roles of Second Yeoman and then Lieutenant of the Tower in The Yeomen of the Guard, and Annibale and later Luiz in The Gondoliers. From 1907 to 1909, he toured with D'Oyly Carte, playing the Counsel for the Plaintiff in Trial by Jury, Boatswain in H.M.S. Pinafore, Samuel in The Pirates of Penzance, Archibald Grosvenor in Patience, Strephon in Iolanthe, Arac in Princess Ida, Pish-Tush in The Mikado, Sergeant Meryll in Yeomen, and Luiz. In the second repertory season at the Savoy, from April 1908 to March 1909, he played Pish-Tush, the Boatswain, Private Willis in Iolanthe, Samuel, Luiz and the Lieutenant, and Owen Rhys in A Welsh Sunset a short sentimental piece which was given as a curtain raiser.

Sheffield then left the D'Oyly Carte company but returned to the Savoy Theatre later in 1909, under the management of C. H. Workman, creating the role of Sir Phyllon in Gilbert and Edward German's Fallen Fairies. Gilbert praised him as a "fine baritone" and an "excellent actor". He then toured for five years, beginning with another of Workman's Savoy operas, The Mountaineers, and in musicals, including The Chocolate Soldier, The Girl in the Taxi, and The Girl Who Didn't. He appeared in London only once during this period, as Feste in Twelfth Night, in 1913.

=== D'Oyly Carte principal baritone ===
Sheffield (centre) in The Gondoliers, 1919

In 1915, Sheffield rejoined D'Oyly Carte, remaining with the company until 1928 as its principal baritone. During this period, he appeared as the Learned Judge in Trial, Doctor Daly in The Sorcerer, Dick Deadeye and then Captain Corcoran in Pinafore, the Sergeant of Police in Pirates, Grosvenor in Patience, Willis and sometimes Strephon in Iolanthe, King Hildebrand and sometimes Florian in Princess Ida, Pooh-Bah in The Mikado, Sir Despard Murgatroyd in Ruddigore, Wilfred Shadbolt in Yeomen, and Don Alhambra in The Gondoliers. Comparing Sheffield's Pooh-Bah with that of his predecessor, Fred Billington, the critic of The Manchester Guardian, Samuel Langford, wrote, "Mr. Leo Sheffield finds his resource in a more yielding variety, a greater urbanity of appeal to the audience, and in affectionate emulation of his predecessor's genial condescensions." Sheffield's only overseas tour with the company was in 1927, playing a five-month tour of Canada. He left D'Oyly Carte in June 1928, appearing in 1929 in a revival of the musical comedy The Lady of the Rose. He returned to D'Oyly Carte for the London season at the Savoy from October 1929 to March 1930, after which he left the company permanently.

Sheffield was well-liked in the D'Oyly Carte and by audiences and the public; Webster Booth called him "perhaps the happiest man I have ever known". In 1906 Sheffield married Claire (born c. 1880), an actress from Sydney in Australia, with whom he had a child. He was later married to a D'Oyly Carte Opera Company chorister, Dorothy Gates (1897–1977), who joined the company in 1923. Their daughter, Patience, married the D'Oyly Carte principal comedian of the 1950s, Peter Pratt.

=== Later years ===
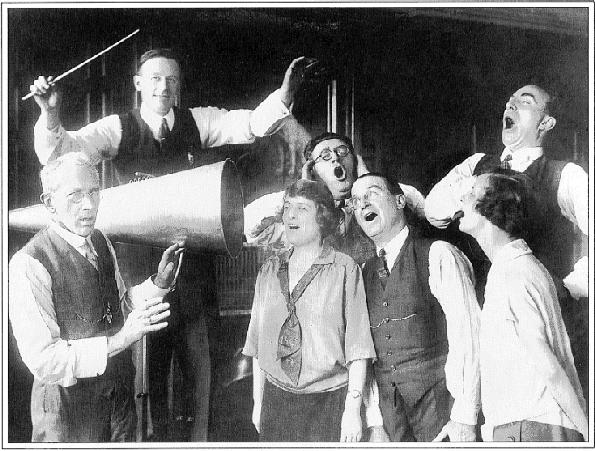
(l to r) J. M. Gordon, Norris, Winifred Lawson, Sheffield, Henry Lytton, Eileen Sharp and Darrell Fancourt – publicity shot for Princess Ida, 1924

In 1930, Sheffield appeared in "a new all-British musical comedy", Little Tommy Tucker, with music by Vivian Ellis, at Daly's Theatre. In 1931, after appearing with George Grossmith, Jr. in My Sister and I, at the Shaftesbury Theatre, he was in a revival of Sheridan's The Duenna at the Lyric Theatre, Hammersmith. The Times commented, "Mr. Leo Sheffield's Don Jerome will be better when he is surer of his lines," but The Observer thought him a "ripe purveyor … of fatherly fun." Also in 1931 he played in a revival of The Geisha at Daly's, which was followed by a provincial tour. The Geisha was succeeded at Daly's in 1932 by a revival of San Toy, in which he played Yen How. In 1933, he played in a non-musical comedy, Mother of Pearl, by A. P. Herbert, in a cast including Rex Harrison, and Richard Murdoch. The Geisha was revived again in 1934. The Times wrote, "Mr. Leo Sheffield plays the Marquis Imari with an easy mastery."

Sheffield also appeared in a number of films, beginning in 1928 with The Valley of Ghosts, followed by Lord Richard in the Pantry (1930); Compromising Daphne (1930); Rodney Steps In (1931); High Society (1932); Falling for You (1933); and others. On stage in 1935, he appeared in a musical farce, Twenty to One. For the Christmas season of 1936, he appeared in the pantomime Aladdin with Stanley Holloway. In 1938, he toured as Captain Hook in Peter Pan, with Anna Neagle in the title role, and reprised the part the following year with Jean Forbes-Robertson as Peter.

His last role in London was Popoff in The Chocolate Soldier in 1940, which also toured the provinces. He later toured in The Beggar's Opera in 1941 and served with Entertainments National Service Association in 1942. Now 70 years old, he toured in The Chocolate Soldier and Blossom Time in 1943. In 1944, Sheffield played Sir Lester Dedlock in a serialisation of Bleak House for BBC radio, and in 1945 he toured in Naughty Marietta, with Derek Oldham, The Gypsy Baron, and The Melody of Love. In 1947, he appeared as himself and as Pooh-Bah in the original radio biography, Gilbert and Sullivan, written by Leslie Baily.

He died suddenly in Kingsbury, London, in 1951, aged 77.

== Recordings ==
With the D'Oyly Carte Opera Company, Sheffield recorded Sir Despard (1924), King Hildebrand (1925), Pooh-Bah (1927), Don Alhambra (1927), the Learned Judge (1928), the Sergeant of Police (1929) and Wilfred Shadbolt (1929). He participated in a 1926 BBC radio broadcast of The Mikado, and as Pooh-Bah in a four-minute promotional silent film made to publicise the new production of The Mikado. Later, Sheffield made recordings of comic songs with Cicely Courtneidge.

== Sources ==
- Joseph, Tony (2003). Aileen Davies: 1920s Soubrette. Bristol: Bunthorne Books. ISBN 0950-7992-5-4.
- Rollins, Cyril; R. John Witts (1962). The D'Oyly Carte Opera Company in Gilbert and Sullivan Operas: A Record of Productions, 1875–1961. London: Michael Joseph. OCLC 504581419.
