= Signor Brocolini =

American opera singer, actor and journalist

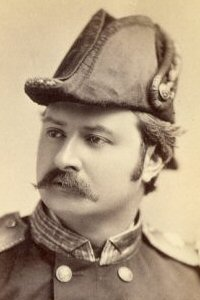
Signor Brocolini as Captain Corcoran in H.M.S. Pinafore

John Clark, better known as Signor Brocolini (September 26, 1841 – June 7, 1906), was an Irish-born American operatic singer and actor remembered for creating the role of the Pirate King in the original New York City production of The Pirates of Penzance by Gilbert and Sullivan, in 1879–80.

After moving to Brooklyn, New York, as a child, Brocolini became interested in baseball and music. He began his career in the early 1870s as a journalist, then a baseball player, while also beginning a part-time singing career. After brief study in Italy in 1875, he was engaged to sing opera in London and on tour by James Henry Mapleson, adopting his stage name from the borough of Brooklyn, and Italianizing it. In 1879, he joined the D'Oyly Carte Opera Company, with which he returned to the United States, where he originated the role of the Pirate King. Over the next decade, he mostly toured in America, briefly visiting Australia, and played mostly in Gilbert and Sullivan roles, often with E. E. Rice and John Stetson companies. He eventually returned to Brooklyn.

== Life and career ==
Brocolini was the son of John P. Clark of Glasgow (died 1874), a printer, and his wife Lilias (or Lillian) née Morison from Linton, Perthshire, Scotland (died 1892). He was born in County Cork, Ireland. After returning to Scotland, the family emigrated to the United States, settling in Brooklyn, New York, in 1852. Young Brocolini became an avid baseball fan and player. By his teens, he was also learning the printing trade from his father, who was working for the Brooklyn publishing firm Harper & Brothers. He also developed an interest in singing, eventually studying with Antonio Bagioli, among others.

=== Journalism, baseball and singing beginnings ===
Brocolini began his career in the early 1860s working for newspapers, soon becoming a reporter in Brooklyn. At the same time, still under the name John Clark, he began taking professional singing engagements, including with several touring opera companies and with Bowers and Prendergast's Minstrels in 1864. In the spring of 1865, immediately after the American Civil War, Brocolini moved to Detroit, Michigan. He began there as a proofreader for the Detroit Advertiser and Tribune and also played first base for the newly revived Detroit Base Ball Club. In July 1865, he married Lizzie Fox, the daughter of Robert Fox, a blacksmith. The couple had a son, Kingsley. The Advertiser and Tribune reported closely on baseball, and Brocolini eventually began to write editorials. He became club director of the Detroit team. Brocolini helped his team to become the dominant club in Michigan and the region.

In 1868, Brocolini moved back to Brooklyn and continued his journalism career, eventually writing editorials for the Brooklyn Eagle by the 1870s. He continued to sing in concerts, appearing as bass soloist at the Brooklyn Academy of Music and at various churches and other venues, and toured with Susan Galton's operetta company. He even produced some opera in Brooklyn. In 1872, he sang at a concert at the Church of the Messiah in Brooklyn, held to dedicate a new organ. The same year, he was leading the newly formed Brooklyn Operatic Association and performed in The Pearl of Baghdad, an opera by John M. Loretz. Through the early 1870s, he became increasingly well known as a singer in New York City. Finally, in 1875, his friends at the newspaper decided to raise money to send him to study singing in Milan, Italy. Brocolini wrote, "The complete change in my life was effected in less than three hours.... They put in what money they could themselves, called on my wealthy friends in Brooklyn for subscriptions, and in less than three hours they raised $5500 for me."

With a big sendoff from Brooklyn, including a banquet attended by Mayor John W. Hunter, among others, Brocolini sailed for Milan and soon decided to adopt his new stage name to honor the borough in which he grew up. In Italy, he studied voice with Antonio Sangiovanni. While there, he wrote "Observations by a Brooklyn Student of Music", for the Brooklyn Eagle, complaining of the treatment of foreign music students by their Italian teachers. By the spring of 1876, he had been engaged to sing by James Henry Mapleson's Italian opera company at the Theatre Royal, Drury Lane in London, now using his stage name, Signor Brocolini.

=== Full-time singing career ===
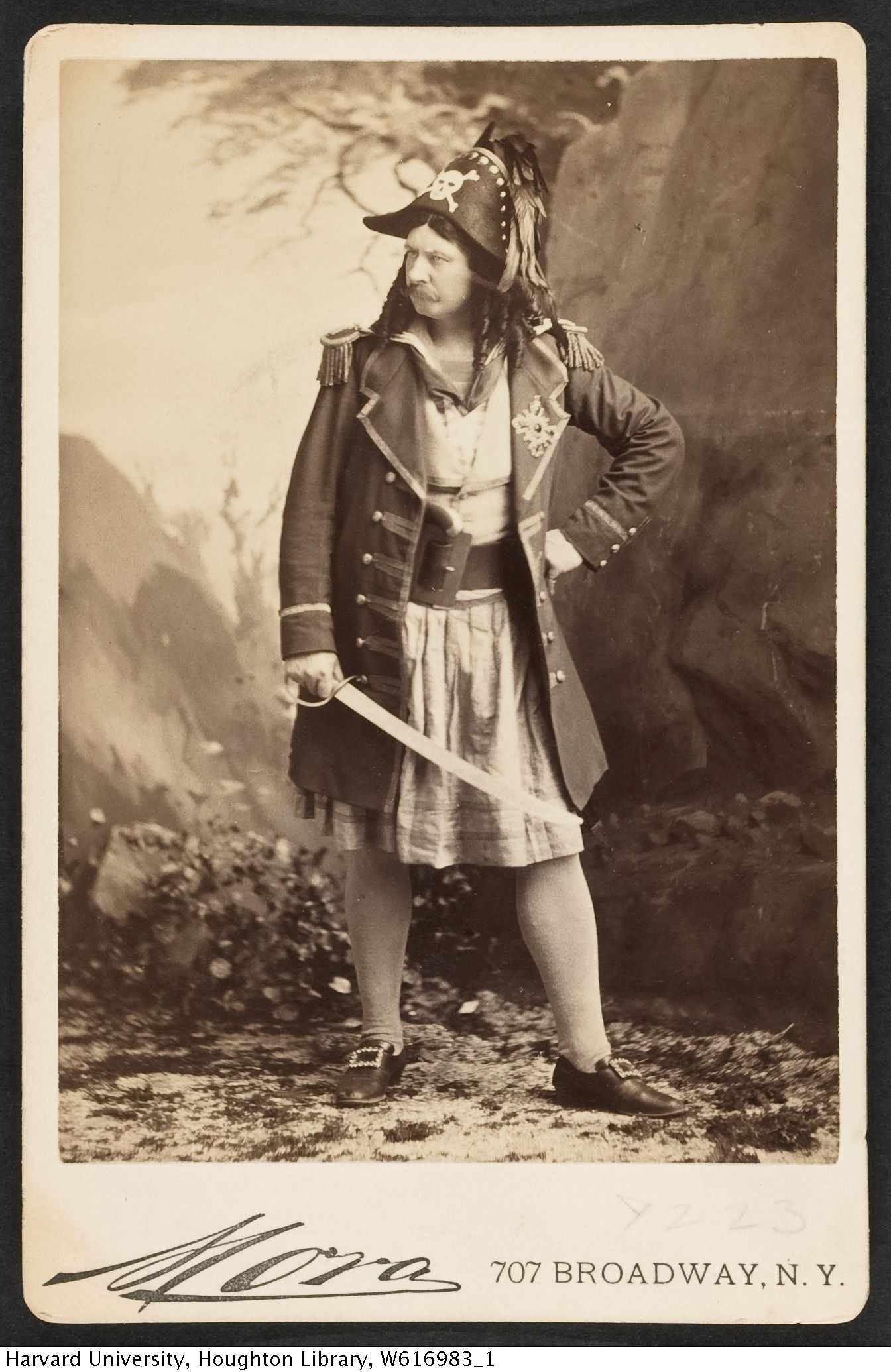
Brocolini as the Pirate King, the role he created

Brocolini started in smaller bass roles in London and was promoted to larger roles when the company toured, alongside Thérèse Tietjens, in 1876. The next year, he sang more substantial roles at Her Majesty's Theatre, until he left Mapleson's company. In 1878–1879 he sang at Albert Hall, The Crystal Palace, the Royal Aquarium, St James's Hall and at the Covent Garden proms, among other concert venues in London and elsewhere in England. In mid-1879, he sang at the Alexandra Palace with Blanche Cole's opera and concert group, with whom he made his last appearances in serious opera.

Brocolini joined the D'Oyly Carte Opera Company in October 1879 in Liverpool, England, playing Dick Deadeye in H.M.S. Pinafore with one of Carte's touring companies. In November, he traveled to New York to appear as Captain Corcoran in the first authorized American production of Pinafore at the Fifth Avenue Theatre, which premiered on December 1, 1879. He then created the role of the Pirate King in The Pirates of Penzance on December 31, 1879 at the same theatre, earning a good notice from The New York Times. He continued to play the Pirate King in New York and on tour through June 1880. After Carte's production closed, Brocolini played the Pirate King in a non-D'Oyly Carte production, including in Boston the last two weeks of July. Carte sued Brocolini in US federal court for breach of a contract to perform with D'Oyly Carte, and an order was entered against Brocolini in August 1880 enjoining him from performing for any other company.

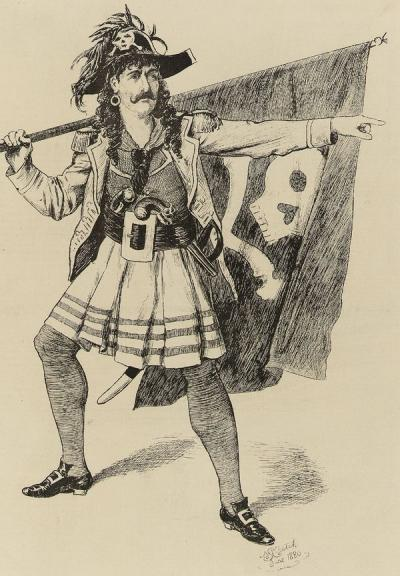
1880 drawing of the Pirate King

Brocolini rejoined D'Oyly Carte and E. E. Rice in a tour of Billee Taylor in April 1881, playing Christopher Crab. The tour continued into the summer of 1881, later under the auspices of the Rice-Goodwin Lyric Comedy Company. He then played the role of Dr Kindergarten in Nat Goodwin's Dr Syntax at the Boston Museum, and, with his own Paine-Brocolini Opera Company, produced Fadette, or the Days of Robespierre and The Rose of the Auvergne. In other non-D'Oyly Carte companies, Brocolini played in Pinafore and Patience at Haverley's Theatre, Brooklyn, in February 1882, and then toured as the Pirate King, Christopher Crab, and Captain Corcoran with the Boston Comic Opera Company. At the Fifth Avenue Theatre in October 1882, he again played Christopher Crab in Billee Taylor. From late 1882 to the spring of 1883, he appeared with Collier's Standard Opera Company in the role of Strephon in Iolanthe, the first work produced at the Boston Bijou Theatre. With Collier's at the Bijou, he next appeared in the musical Pounce & Co., and then in The Sorcerer, as Sir Marmaduke Pointdextre. In early 1884, Brocolini played King Hildebrand in New York's first production of Princess Ida, at the Fifth Avenue Theatre, produced by E. E. Rice.

By 1884, Brocolini's marriage had ended in divorce, and Lizzie had remarried the former singer Carlos Florentine, who had appeared in Sullivan's The Zoo (1875), and whom the Clarks had known in London. Florentine and Lizzie, according to the press, had fallen on hard times and were being helped by The Salvation Army. The press made Brocolini seem wealthy and heartless while his ex-wife starved. Florentine, however, was working as a church musician in 1888, so it appears that the press coverage was unfair. Brocolini next joined a comic opera company in Montreal. He traveled to Australia the following year, where he appeared with the Williamson, Garner and Musgrove Royal Comic Opera Company beginning in April 1885, in Melbourne with La Petite Mademoiselle by Charles Lecocq. He reprised the role of Strephon in Iolanthe in Melbourne and Sydney until June 1885. In October 1885 he was back in Boston, appearing in "Stradella" at the Bijou Theatre.

He next toured as Pooh-Bah in The Mikado from November 1885 through May 1886. In late 1886, at the Fifth Avenue Theatre, he reprised the roles of Pooh Bah and King Hildebrand. In early 1887, he toured in New England, with producer John Stetson, playing the roles of Colonel Calverley in Patience, King Hildebrand in Princess Ida, and Sir Despard Murgatroyd in Ruddigore. He also formed his own company to produce Pirates in Boston in the summer of 1887.

=== Later years ===
By 1887, Brocolini had begun to suffer from acute rheumatism, which forced him to reduce his performing schedule over the next few years. He performed his usual roles in revivals of Ruddigore and The Mikado in 1888 with the Stetson Opera Company, played the Duke of Plaza Toro in The Gondoliers in 1890 in Brooklyn, and appeared in Patience in 1892 with the Brooklyn Amateur Operetta Company. He also appeared in The Corsair as Seyd Pasha with Rice's company and in The Yeomen of the Guard with Stetson's company in 1889, and he continued to sing oratorio until at least 1892.

In 1890, Brocolini had returned to Brooklyn, where his mother and sister still lived, and he became the music critic for the Brooklyn Eagle. Beginning in 1894, he trained and conducted choirs in Brooklyn, founding The Brocolini Choir. He also wrote articles on music and composed a number of musical works, including the cantata, The Triumph of the Cross, other church music and some operettas.

In 1897, Brocolini married Sarah (born 1856), the daughter of Connecticut confectioner and grocer, George D. Bradley. In 1905, he began to manage the Millard Opera Company, which starred Laura Millard. Brocolini died in Brooklyn, of liver disease, in 1906.
