= Lakeshore General Hospital =

- CIUSSS de l'Ouest-de-L’Île-de-Montréal
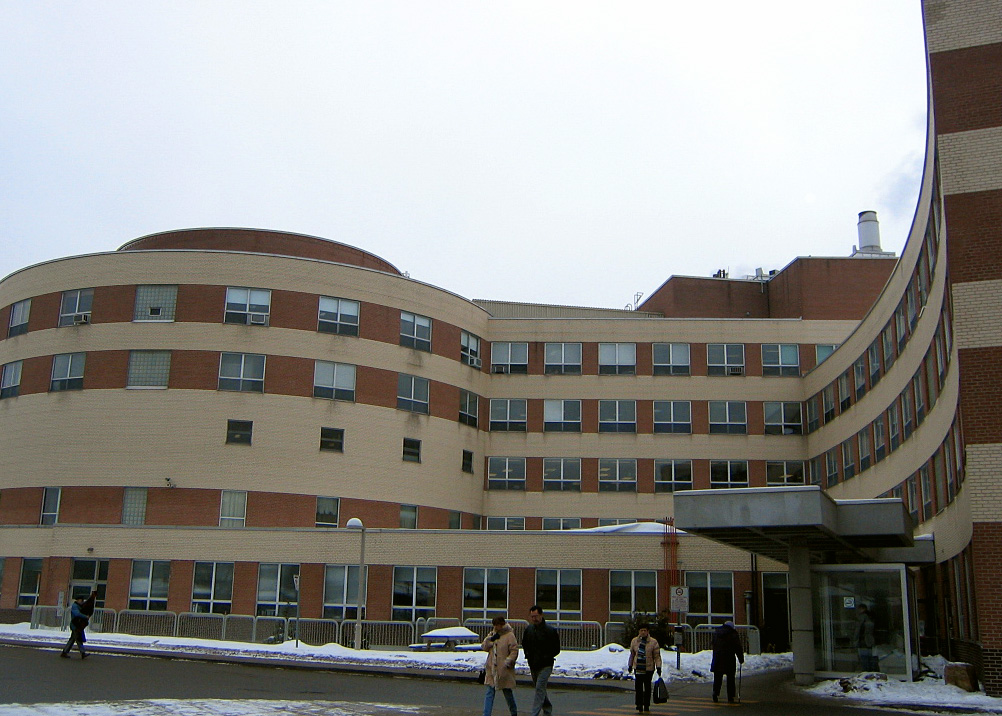
- The exterior of the Lakeshore General Hospital.

- Location in Montreal

Geography
- Location: Pointe-Claire, Quebec, Canada
- Coordinates: 45.448°N 73.834°W

Organization
- Care system: RAMQ (Quebec medicare)
- Type: General
- Affiliated university: McGill University Faculty of Medicine

Services
- Emergency department: Yes
- Beds: 265

History
- Founded: 1965

Links
- Website: Official website
- Lists: Hospitals in Canada

The Lakeshore General Hospital (Hôpital général du Lakeshore) (LGH) is a Canadian acute care institution located in Pointe-Claire, Quebec, a suburban municipality near Montreal, Quebec. The hospital employs 1,599 employees and contains 265 beds, and serves an estimated population of 377,000 in the West Island region of Montreal.

The LGH is situated close to major highway arteries such as Highways 13, 20, 40, and 520 and is often called upon to treat and stabilize accident victims. Its emergency department is one of the busiest for distress cases in Montreal with over 40,000 visits annually.

The Lakeshore General Hospital opened in 1965. It is part of the Centre intégré universitaire de santé et de services sociaux de l'Ouest-de-l'Île (Montreal West Island Integrated University Health and Social Services Centre).
