= Princess Ida =

1884 comic opera by Gilbert & Sullivan

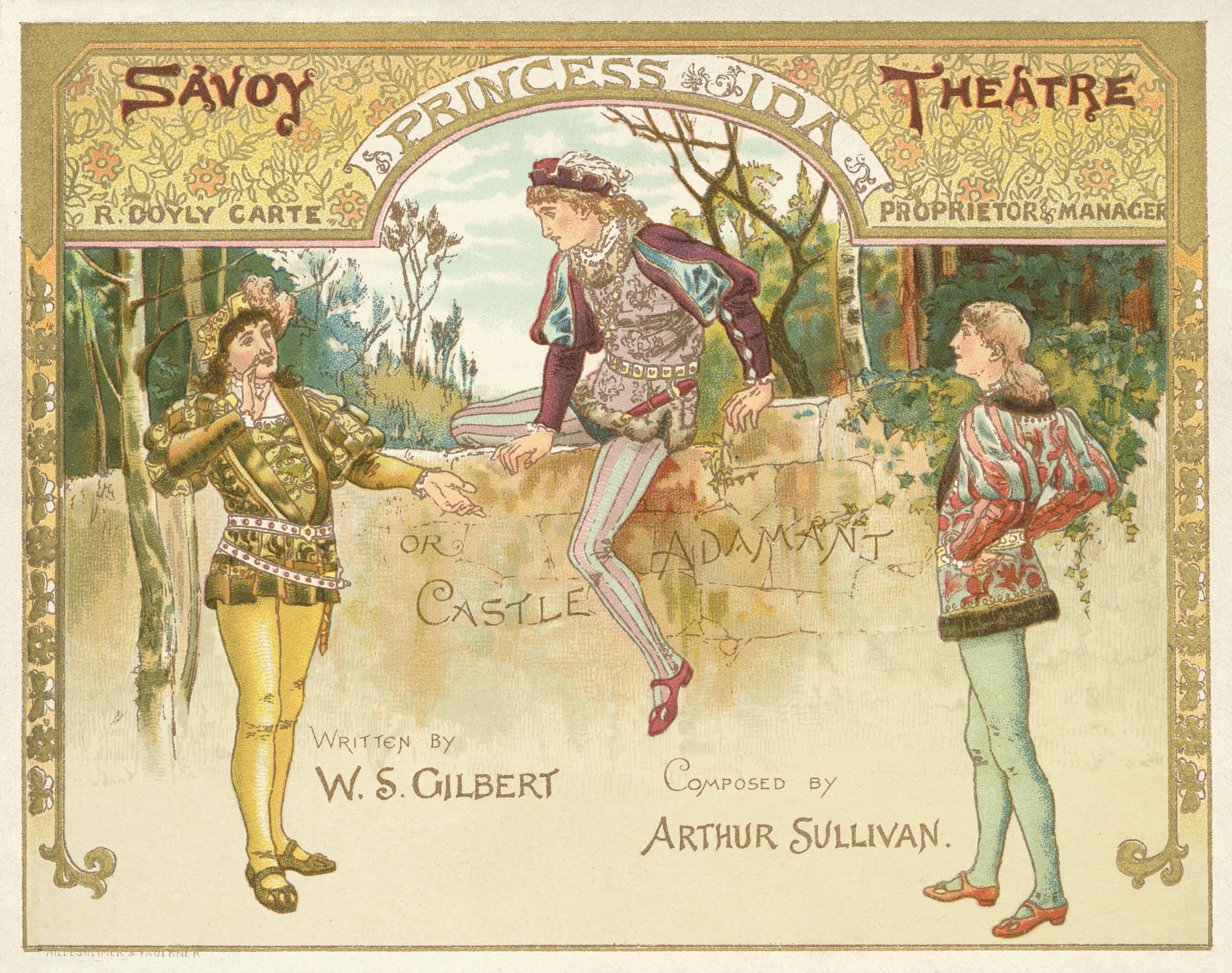
"Gently, gently": Hilarion, Cyril, and Florian break into Castle Adamant: cover of 1884 souvenir programme by Alice Havers

Princess Ida; or, Castle Adamant is a comic opera with music by Arthur Sullivan and a libretto by W. S. Gilbert. It was their eighth operatic collaboration of fourteen; the next was The Mikado. Princess Ida opened at the Savoy Theatre on 5 January 1884 and ran for 246 performances. The piece concerns a princess who founds a women's university and teaches that women are superior to men and should rule in their stead. Prince Hilarion, to whom she was betrothed in infancy, sneaks into the university, together with two friends, with the aim of collecting his bride. They disguise themselves as female students but are discovered, and all soon face a literal war between the sexes.

The opera satirizes feminism, women's education and Darwinian evolution, which were controversial topics in conservative Victorian England. Princess Ida is based on a narrative poem by Alfred, Lord Tennyson called The Princess (1847), and Gilbert had written a farcical musical play, based on the poem, in 1870. He lifted much of the dialogue of Princess Ida directly from his 1870 farce. It is the only Gilbert and Sullivan opera in three acts and the only one with dialogue in blank verse.

Though its original run was modestly profitable, by Savoy opera standards Princess Ida was not considered a success, partly because of a particularly hot summer in London in 1884, and it was not revived in London until 1919. Nevertheless, the piece is performed regularly today by both professional and amateur companies, although not as frequently as the most popular of the Savoy operas.

== Background ==
=== Genesis ===
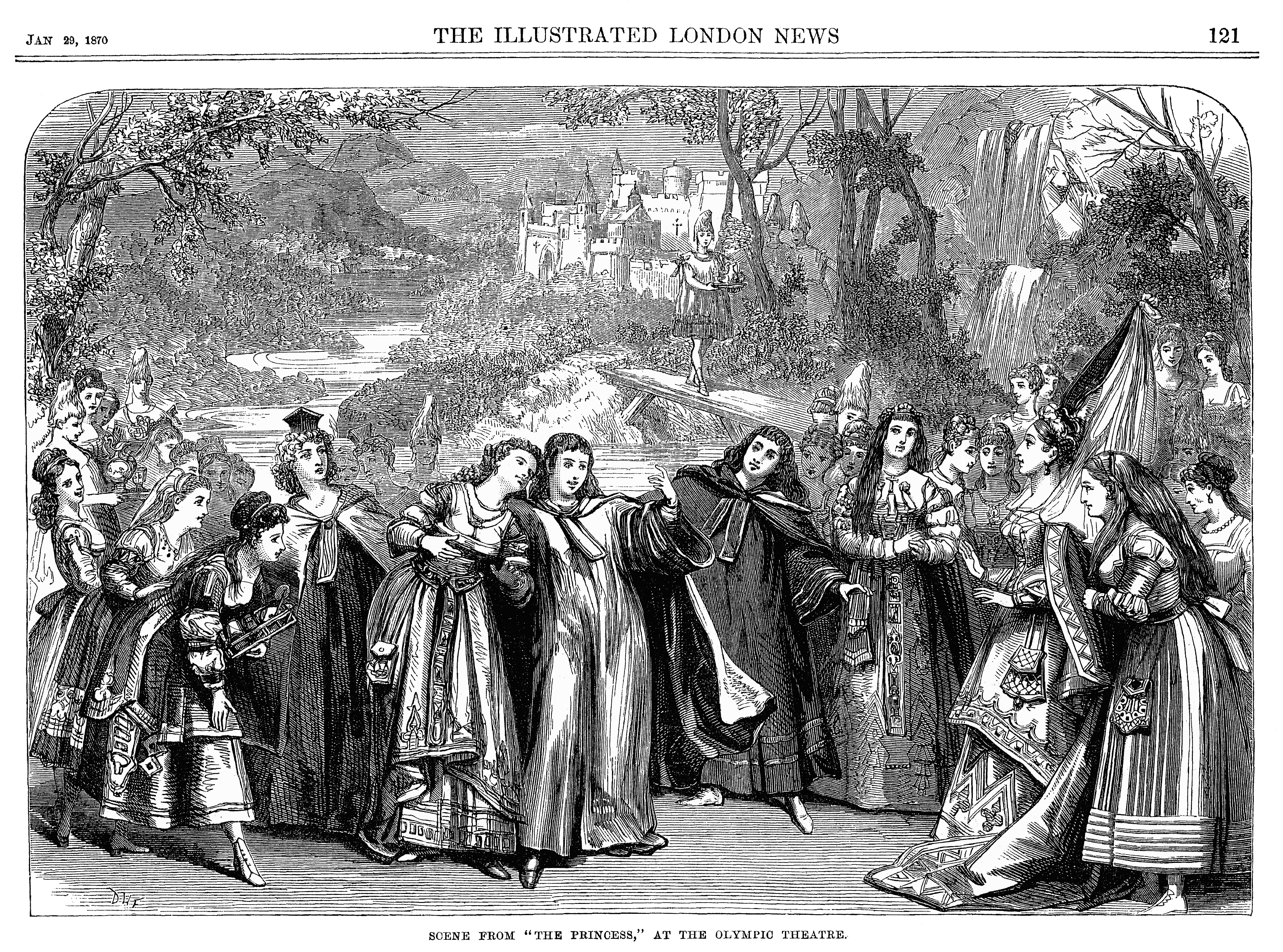
Scene from Gilbert's 1870 play, The Princess: Hilarion and his companions, disguised as women (but played by women impersonating men) meet Princess Ida and her students.

Princess Ida is based on Tennyson's serio-comic narrative poem of 1847, The Princess: A Medley. Gilbert had written a blank verse musical farce burlesquing the same material in 1870 called The Princess. He reused a good deal of the dialogue from this earlier play in the libretto of Princess Ida. He also retained Tennyson's blank verse style and the basic story line about a heroic princess who runs a women's college and the prince who loves her. He and his two friends infiltrate the college disguised as female students. Gilbert wrote entirely new lyrics for Princess Ida, since the lyrics to his 1870 farce were written to previously existing music by Offenbach, Rossini and others.

Tennyson's poem was written, in part, in response to the founding of Queen's College, London, the first college of women's higher education in the United Kingdom, in 1847. When Gilbert wrote The Princess in 1870, women's higher education was still an innovative, even radical concept. Girton College, one of the constituent colleges of the University of Cambridge, was established in 1869. However, by the time Gilbert and Sullivan collaborated on Princess Ida in 1883, a women's college was a more established concept. Westfield College, the first college to open with the aim of educating women for University of London degrees, had opened in Hampstead in 1882. Thus, women's higher education was in the news in London, and Westfield is cited as a model for Gilbert's Castle Adamant.

Increasingly viewing his work with Gilbert as unimportant, beneath his skills and repetitious, Sullivan had intended to resign from the partnership with Gilbert and Richard D'Oyly Carte after Iolanthe, but after a recent financial loss, he concluded that his financial needs required him to continue writing Savoy operas. Therefore, in February 1883, with Iolanthe still playing strongly at the Savoy Theatre, Gilbert and Sullivan signed a new five-year partnership agreement to create new operas for Carte upon six months' notice. He also gave his consent to Gilbert to continue with the adaptation of The Princess as the basis for their next opera. Later that spring, Sullivan was knighted by Queen Victoria and the honour was announced in May at the opening of the Royal College of Music. Although it was the operas with Gilbert that had earned him the broadest fame, the honour was conferred for his services to serious music. The musical establishment, and many critics, believed that Sullivan's knighthood should put an end to his career as a composer of comic opera – that a musical knight should not stoop below oratorio or grand opera. Having just signed the five-year agreement, Sullivan suddenly felt trapped.

By the end of July 1883, Gilbert and Sullivan were revising drafts of the libretto for Ida. Sullivan finished some of the composition by early September when he had to begin preparations for his conducting duties at the triennial Leeds Festival, held in October. In late October, Sullivan turned his attentions back to Ida, and rehearsals began in November. Gilbert was also producing a one-act drama, Comedy and Tragedy, and keeping an eye on a revival of his Pygmalion and Galatea at the Lyceum Theatre by Mary Anderson's company. In mid-December, Sullivan bade farewell to his sister-in-law Charlotte, the widow of his brother Fred, who departed with her young family to America, never to return. Sullivan's oldest nephew, Herbert, stayed behind in England as his uncle's ward, and Sullivan threw himself into the task of orchestrating the score of Princess Ida. As he had done with Iolanthe, Sullivan wrote the overture himself, rather than assigning it to an assistant as he did in the case of most of his operas.

=== Production ===
Brandram as Blanche

Princess Ida is the only Gilbert and Sullivan work with dialogue entirely in blank verse and the only one of their works in three acts (and the longest opera to that date). The piece calls for a larger cast, and the soprano title role requires a more dramatic voice than the earlier works. The American star Lillian Russell was engaged to create the title role of Princess Ida, but Gilbert did not believe that she was dedicated enough, and when she missed a rehearsal, she was dismissed. The D'Oyly Carte Opera Company's usual female lead, Leonora Braham, a light lyric soprano, nevertheless moved up from the part of Lady Psyche to assume the title role. Rosina Brandram got her big break when Alice Barnett became ill and left the company for a time, taking the role of Lady Blanche and becoming the company's principal contralto.

The previous Savoy opera, Iolanthe, closed after 398 performances on 1 January 1884, the same day that Sullivan composed the last of the musical numbers for Ida. Despite gruelling rehearsals over the next few days, and suffering from exhaustion, Sullivan conducted the opening performance on 5 January 1884 and collapsed from exhaustion immediately afterwards. The reviewer for the Sunday Times wrote that the score of Ida was "the best in every way that Sir Arthur Sullivan has produced, apart from his serious works.... Humour is almost as strong a point with Sir Arthur... as with his clever collaborator...." The humour of the piece also drew the comment that Gilbert and Sullivan's work "has the great merit of putting everyone in a good temper." The praise for Sullivan's effort was unanimous, though Gilbert's work received some mixed notices.

=== Aftermath ===
Sullivan's close friend, composer Frederic Clay, had suffered a serious stroke in early December 1883 that ended his career. Sullivan, reflecting on this, his own precarious health and his desire to devote himself to more serious music, informed Richard D'Oyly Carte on 29 January 1884 that he had determined "not to write any more 'Savoy' pieces." Sullivan fled the London winter to convalesce in Monte Carlo as seven provincial tours (one with a 17-year-old Henry Lytton in the chorus) and the U.S. production of Ida set out.

Bab illustration for Princess Ida

As Princess Ida began to show signs of flagging early on, Carte sent notice, on 22 March 1884, to both Gilbert and Sullivan under the five-year contract, that a new opera would be required in six months' time. Sullivan replied that "it is impossible for me to do another piece of the character of those already written by Gilbert and myself." Gilbert was surprised to hear of Sullivan's hesitation and had started work on a new opera involving a plot in which people fell in love against their wills after taking a magic lozenge – a plot that Sullivan had previously rejected. Gilbert wrote to Sullivan asking him to reconsider, but the composer replied on 2 April that he had "come to the end of my tether" with the operas:

...I have been continually keeping down the music in order that not one [syllable] should be lost.... I should like to set a story of human interest & probability where the humorous words would come in a humorous (not serious) situation, & where, if the situation were a tender or dramatic one the words would be of similar character."

Gilbert was much hurt, but Sullivan insisted that he could not set the "lozenge plot". In addition to the "improbability" of it, it was too similar to the plot of their 1877 opera, The Sorcerer, and was too complex a plot. Sullivan returned to London, and, as April wore on, Gilbert tried to rewrite his plot, but he could not satisfy Sullivan. The parties were at a stalemate, and Gilbert wrote, "And so ends a musical & literary association of seven years' standing – an association of exceptional reputation – an association unequalled in its monetary results, and hitherto undisturbed by a single jarring or discordant element." However, by 8 May 1884, Gilbert was ready to back down, writing, "...am I to understand that if I construct another plot in which no supernatural element occurs, you will undertake to set it? ... a consistent plot, free from anachronisms, constructed in perfect good faith & to the best of my ability." The stalemate was broken, and on 20 May, Gilbert sent Sullivan a sketch of the plot to The Mikado.

A particularly hot summer in London did not help ticket sales for Princess Ida and forced Carte to close the theatre during the heat of August. The piece ran for a comparatively short 246 performances, and for the first time since 1877, the opera closed before the next Savoy opera was ready to open. Princess Ida was not revived in London until 1919. Some of these events are dramatised in the 1999 film Topsy-Turvy.

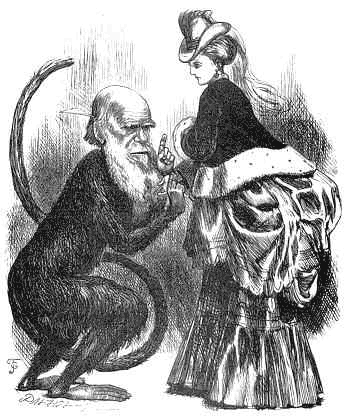
Caricature of Charles Darwin contemplating a bustle, in Fun, 1872

== Musical and textual analysis ==
The opera satirizes feminism, women's education and Darwinian evolution, all of which were controversial topics in conservative Victorian England. In the 15 years between the time that Gilbert wrote The Princess and the premiere of Princess Ida, the movement for women's education had gained momentum in Britain, with the founding of Girton College (1869) and Newnham College (1871) at the University of Cambridge; and Somerville (1878) and Lady Margaret Hall (1878) at the University of Oxford. Westfield College, a women's college in Hampstead, London, opened in 1882.

As in Patience and Iolanthe, the two previous Gilbert and Sullivan operas, Princess Ida concerns the war between the sexes. In Patience, the aesthetic-crazed women are contrasted with vain military men; in Iolanthe, the vague and flighty fairies (women) are pitted against the ineffective, dim-witted peers (men); and in Ida, overly serious students and professors at a women's university (women) defy a marriage-by-force ultimatum by a militaristic king and his testosterone-laden court (men). Princess Ida is one of several Gilbert plays, including The Wicked World, Broken Hearts, Fallen Fairies and Iolanthe, where the introduction of males into a tranquil world of women brings "mortal love" that wreaks havoc with the status quo. Stedman calls this a "Gilbertian invasion plot".

Sullivan's score is majestic, and a sequence of songs in Act II, sometimes known as the "string of pearls", is particularly well loved. Sullivan used chromatic and scalar passages and key modulations throughout the score, and commenters have called the Act II quartet "The World Is But a Broken Toy" one of Sullivan's "most beautiful, plaintive melodies." It has also been called "Gounodesque". Although Gilbert's libretto contains many funny lines, the iambic pentameter and three-act structure tend to make Ida more difficult to stage effectively than some of the other Savoy Operas. In addition, modern audiences sometimes find the libretto's dated portrayal of sex roles, and the awkward resolution of the opera, unsatisfying. It is also curious, after the string of successes that the partnership had experienced with George Grossmith and Rutland Barrington in starring roles, to choose a theme that relegated them to comparatively minor roles.

== Roles ==
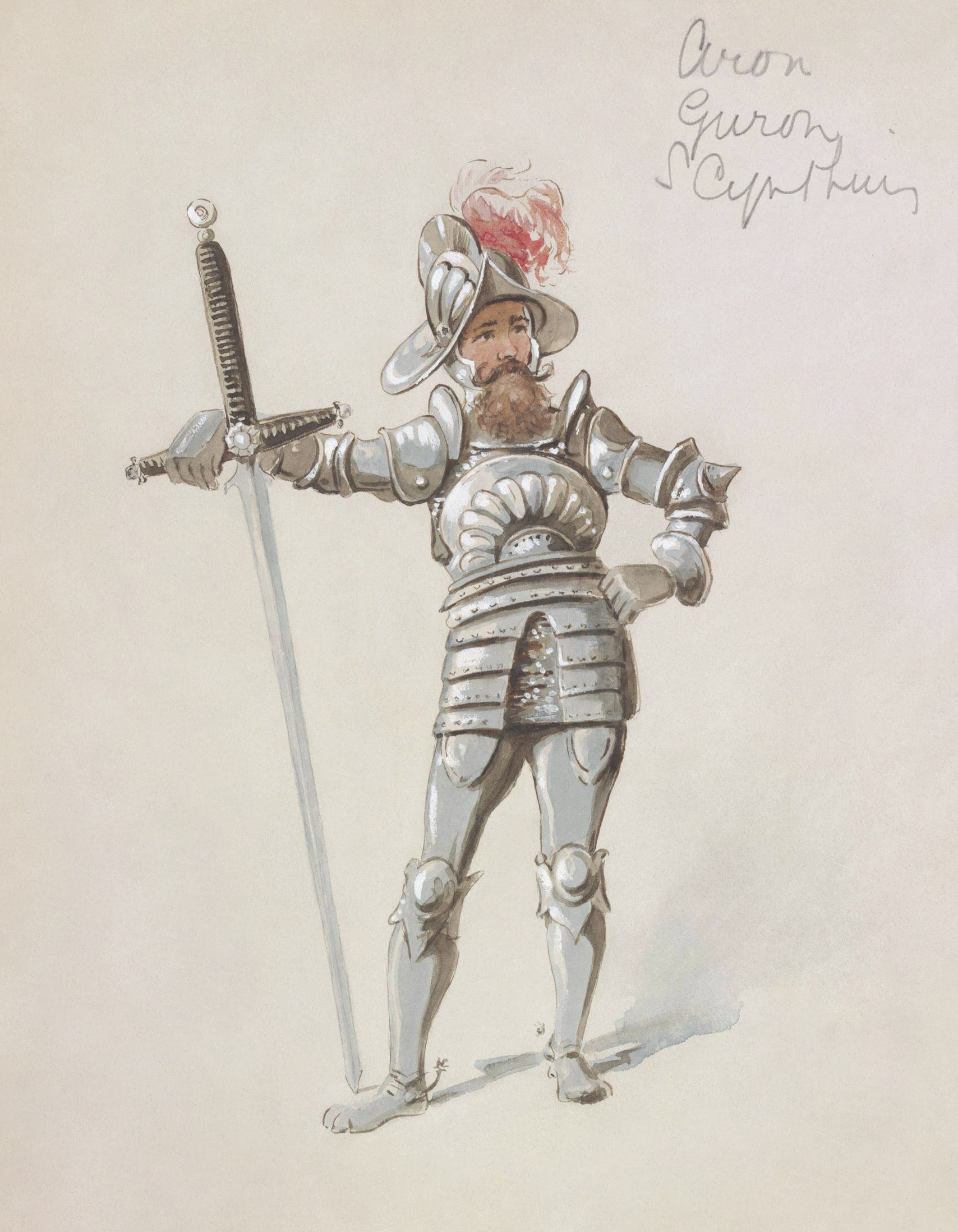
In armour: Costume design for Arac, Guron and Scynthius by Wilhelm, 1884

Out of armour: Guron (Warwick Gray), Arac (Richard Temple) and Scynthius (William Lugg), 1884

- King Hildebrand (bass-baritone)
- Hilarion, King Hildebrand's Son (tenor)
- Cyril, Hilarion's Friend (tenor)
- Florian, Hilarion's Friend (lyric baritone)
- King Gama (comic baritone)
- Arac, King Gama's Son (bass-baritone)
- Guron, King Gama's Son (bass-baritone)
- Scynthius, King Gama's Son (bass)
- Princess Ida, King Gama's Daughter (soprano)
- Lady Blanche, Professor of Abstract Science (contralto)
- Lady Psyche, Professor of Humanities (soprano)
- Melissa, Lady Blanche's Daughter (mezzo-soprano)
- Sacharissa, Girl Graduate (soprano)
- Chloe, Girl Graduate (speaking role/chorus)
- Ada, Girl Graduate (speaking role/chorus)
- Chorus of Soldiers, Courtiers, "Girl Graduates", "Daughters of the Plough", etc.

Lytton as Gama, 1921

== Synopsis ==
=== Act I ===
In a pavilion at King Hildebrand's palace, courtiers wait expectantly for the arrival of King Gama and his daughter Princess Ida, who was betrothed in infancy to Hildebrand's son, Prince Hilarion ("Search throughout the panorama"). Hildebrand promises to wage war against Gama if the Princess should fail to appear ("Now hearken to my strict command"), while Hilarion, who is in love with Ida, although he has not seen her since he was two years old, wonders how she may have changed over the ensuing twenty years ("Ida was a twelvemonth-old").

Ida's war-like (and dull) brothers Arac, Guron and Scynthius, arrive at Hildebrand's palace ("We are warriors three"), preceding their father. King Gama enters, explains his misanthropy ("If you give me your attention I will tell you what I am"), and promptly displays it by insulting Hildebrand and his son. He then announces that Princess Ida has forsworn men and founded a women's university at Castle Adamant, one of his many country houses. The two Kings advise Hilarion to go to Castle Adamant to claim Ida; if she refuses him, Hildebrand will storm the castle ("P'raps if you address the lady"). But Hilarion plans to use romantic means, rather than force, to gain the princess's love. He explains that nature has "armed" him and his friends, the courtiers Cyril and Florian, to win this "war" ("Expressive glances will be our lances"). The three set off to Castle Adamant, while King Gama and his sons are to remain at Hildebrand's palace as hostages ("For a month to dwell in a dungeon cell").

=== Act II ===
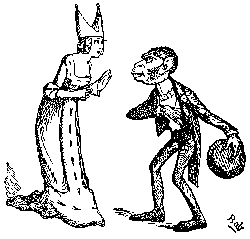
Gilbert's illustration for the "Darwinian Man" song; compare with Darwin image above.

At Castle Adamant, Princess Ida's pupils learn that "man is nature's sole mistake" ("Towards the Empyrean heights"). One of the professors, Lady Blanche, doles out the punishments for the day, for "offences" that include bringing chessmen to the university – "men with whom you give each other mate" – and for sketching a double-perambulator. Princess Ida arrives ("Minerva! Oh hear me") and delivers a stern lecture, stating that women's brains are larger than men's, and predicting that woman shall conquer man, but that once having conquered, woman will treat man better than he has treated her. Lady Blanche resents the princess's authority and predicts that one day she will replace her as head of the university ("Come mighty must", a song often cut from the D'Oyly Carte productions).

Hilarion, Cyril and Florian sneak into Castle Adamant ("Gently, gently"). They scoff at the idea of a woman's college. Finding some discarded academic robes, the three men disguise themselves as young maidens wishing to join the university ("I am a maiden cold and stately"), and are welcomed by Princess Ida ("The world is but a broken toy"). Florian realises that their disguises won't fool his sister, Lady Psyche (one of the professors), and they take her into their confidence. Lady Psyche warns them that they will face death if the princess discovers who they are and informs them of the princess's theories on man, using a parable about an ape who falls in love with a high-born lady to illustrate her point that Darwinian "Man, sprung from an Ape, is Ape at heart" ("A lady fair of lineage high").

Melissa, Lady Blanche's daughter, has overheard them, but, fascinated by the first men she has ever seen, swears herself to secrecy. She falls in love with Florian at first sight, and the company celebrate joyously the discovery that men are not the monsters that Princess Ida had claimed ("The woman of the wisest wit"). Lady Blanche, who has not fallen for the men's disguises, confronts Melissa. Though indignant at first, she is persuaded to keep the men's secret when her daughter points out that if Hilarion is able to woo Princess Ida, Blanche will become head of the university ("Now, wouldn't you like to rule the roast?"). During lunch ("Merrily rings the luncheon bell"), Cyril gets tipsy and inadvertently gives away his friends' identity by singing a bawdy song ("Would you know the kind of maid"). In the ensuing confusion, Princess Ida falls into a stream, and Hilarion rescues her ("Oh joy, our chief is saved"). Despite her rescue, Ida condemns Hilarion and his friends to death. Hilarion counters that without her love to live for, he welcomes death ("Whom thou hast chained"). King Hildebrand and his soldiers arrive, with Ida's brothers in chains. He reminds her that she is bound by contract to marry Hilarion and gives her until the following afternoon to comply ("Some years ago") or incur the guilt of fratricide. The defiant Ida replies that, although Hilarion saved her life and is fair, strong and tall, she would rather die than be his bride ("To yield at once to such a foe").

Illustration by W. Russell Flint, 1909: luncheon scene Act II: Hilarion (disguised as a woman) speaks with Ida.

=== Act III ===
Princess Ida reviews her student troops' readiness to meet Hildebrand's soldiers in battle, but the terrified girls admit that they are afraid of fighting ("Death to the invader!"). Princess Ida is disgusted by their lack of courage and vows that, if necessary, she will fight Hildebrand's army alone ("I built upon a rock"). Her father, King Gama, arrives with a message that Hildebrand prefers not to go to war against women. He reveals that Hildebrand has been torturing him by keeping him in luxury and giving him nothing to complain about ("Whene'er I spoke sarcastic joke"). He suggests that, instead of subjecting her women to all-out war, she pit her three strong, brave brothers against Hilarion and his friends, with Ida's hand to depend on the outcome. Ida is insulted to be "a stake for fighting men" but realises that she has no alternative.

Hildebrand's forces enter, together with Gama and his three sons ("When anger spreads his wing"). Hilarion, Cyril and Florian are still in their women's robes, and King Gama and his sons ridicule them. In preparation for battle, Gama's sons shed their heavy armour, saying that it is too uncomfortable for combat ("This helmet I suppose"). The fight ensues, with Hilarion, Cyril and Florian defeating Gama's sons ("It is our duty plain").

Her wager lost, Ida yields to Hilarion and bitterly asks Lady Blanche if she can resign her post with dignity. The delighted Blanche, who will succeed her as head of the university, assures her that she can. Ida laments the failure of her "cherished scheme" for which, had it been successful, "Posterity would bow in gratitude!", but King Hildebrand points out the flaw in her logic:

If you enlist all women in your cause,
And make them all abjure tyrannic Man,
The obvious question then arises, "How
Is this Posterity to be provided?"

Princess Ida admits, "I never thought of that!" Hilarion makes an emotional appeal, urging her to give Man one chance, while Cyril observes that if she grows tired of the prince, she can return to Castle Adamant. Lady Psyche says that she, too, will return if Cyril does not behave himself, but Melissa swears that she will not return under any circumstances. Finally, Ida admits that she has been wrong, and declares that indeed she loves Hilarion, ending with a quotation directly from the Tennyson poem. All celebrate, ("With joy abiding").

== Musical numbers ==
If you give me your attention
Grahame Clifford as King Gama, 1976

"I can tell a woman's age in half a minute – and I do!" (A line from King Gama's song, "If you give me your attention.")

- Introduction (includes "We are warriors three" and "Minerva! oh, hear me")

Act I

- 1. "Search throughout the panorama" (Florian and Chorus)
- 2. "Now hearken to my strict command" (Hildebrand and Chorus)
- 3. "Today we meet" (Hilarion)
- 4. "From the distant panorama" (Chorus)
- 5. "We are warriors three" (Arac, Guron, Scynthius and Chorus)
- 6. "If you give me your attention" (Gama)
- 7. Finale Act I (Gama, Hildebrand, Cyril, Hilarion, Florian and Chorus)

Act II

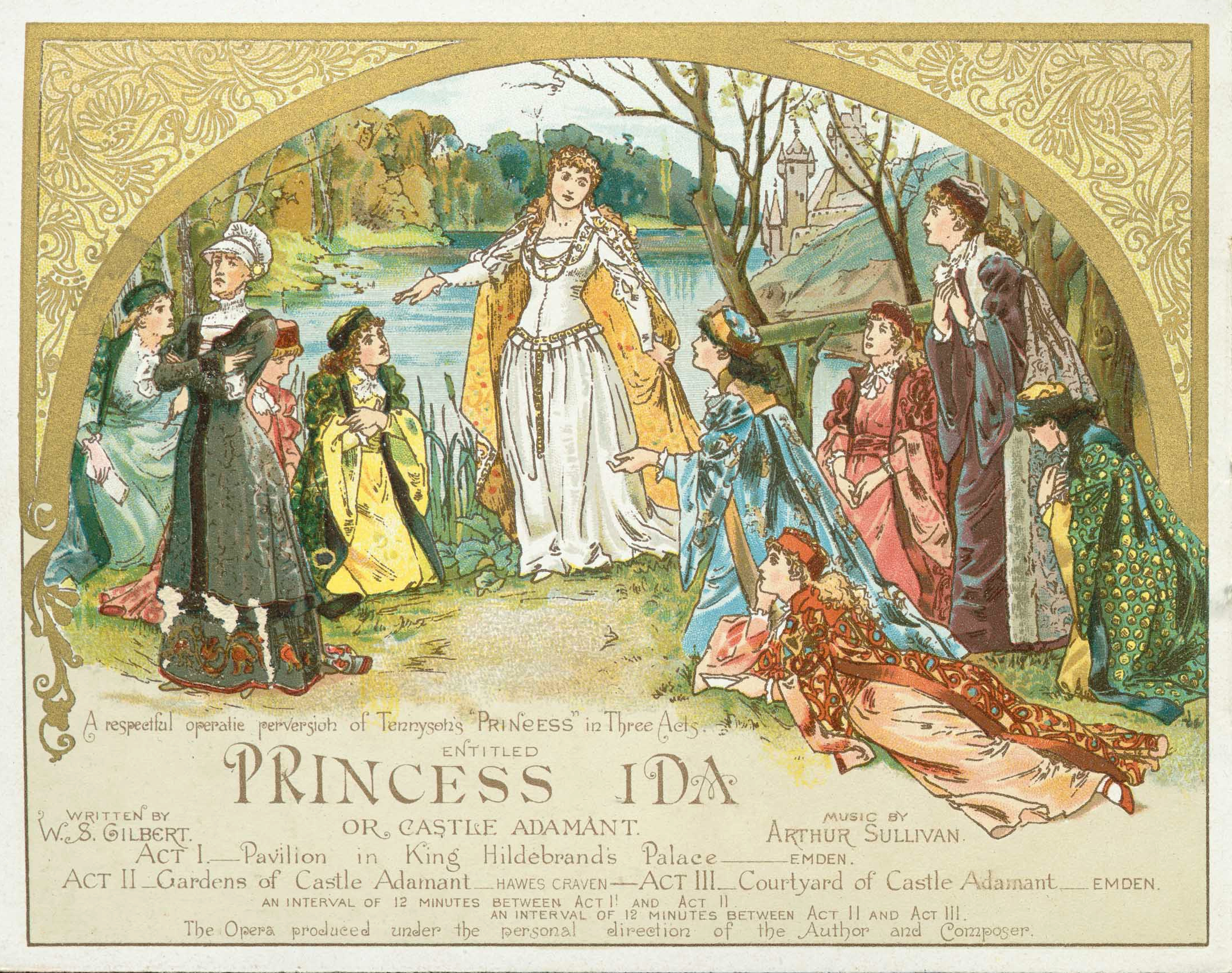
Ida, Blanche and the students: 1884 souvenir programme

- 8. "Towards the empyrean heights" (Lady Psyche, Melissa, Sacharissa and Chorus of Girls)
- 9. "Mighty maiden with a mission" (Chorus of Girls)
- 10. "Minerva! oh, hear me!" ... "Oh, goddess wise" (Princess)
- 10a."And thus to Empyrean Heights" (Princess and Chorus)
- 11. "Come, mighty Must" (Lady Blanche)^{1}
- 12. "Gently, gently" (Cyril, Hilarion and Florian)
- 13. "I am a maiden, cold and stately" (Cyril, Hilarion and Florian)
- 14. "The world is but a broken toy" (Princess, Cyril, Hilarion and Florian)
- 15. "A lady fair, of lineage high" (Psyche with Cyril, Hilarion and Florian)^{2}
- 16. "The woman of the wisest wit" (Psyche, Melissa, Cyril, Hilarion and Florian)
- 17. "Now wouldn't you like to rule the roast" (Melissa and Blanche)^{3}
- 18. "Merrily ring the luncheon bell" (Blanche, Cyril and Chorus of Girls)
- 19. "Would you know the kind of maid?" (Cyril)
- 20. Finale Act II (Princess, Hildebrand, Melissa, Psyche, Blanche, Cyril, Hilarion, Florian, Arac, Guron, Scynthius and Chorus)

^{1} Starting in the 1920s, the D'Oyly Carte Opera Company usually deleted this song in its performances.

^{2} D'Oyly Carte musical director, Harry Norris added prominent horn parts to the accompaniment to "A Lady Fair". They were expunged by Malcolm Sargent but subsequently restored by Royston Nash in the 1970s. These are customarily referred to as the "Norris" horn parts, though they may have been written by Geoffrey Toye.

^{3} The first line of this song is often erroneously sung as "Now wouldn't you like to rule the roost" instead of "roast" (rhymes with "clear the coast" in the next couplet). This typographical error appeared in early vocal scores and still appears in a current Chappell vocal score edition, although other scores have generally corrected it.

Act III

- 21. "Death to the invader" (Melissa and Chorus of Girls)
- 22. "Whene'er I spoke" (King Gama with Chorus of Girls)^{4}
- 23. "I built upon a rock" (Princess)
- 24. "When anger spreads his wing" (Chorus of Girls and Soldiers)
- 25. "This helmet, I suppose" (Arac with Guron, Scynthius and Chorus)
- 26. Chorus during the fight, "This is our duty plain" (Chorus)
- 27. "With joy abiding" [Reprise of "Expressive glances"] (Ensemble)

^{4} In the original production, No. 22 followed No. 23. The present order first appeared in vocal scores published after the first London revival in 1919.

Gilbert claimed that "If you give me your attention" was a satiric self-reference, saying: "I thought it my duty to live up to my reputation". Tom Lehrer performs a parody of the same song called "The Professor's Song". Music from the overture of Ida is heard in Mickey, Donald, Goofy: The Three Musketeers.

== Versions of the text ==
Princess Ida was not revived in London during the authors' lifetimes, and there were no substantive changes to the text after the premiere. The one alteration was purely cosmetic: the first act had originally been called a "Prologue". It was re-designated Act I, with a consequent renumbering of the remaining acts.

At around the time of the first London revival, in 1919, there were changes to the running order of Act III. As written originally, the sequence of Act III is as follows:

"Jump for Joy and Gaily Bound!" (from Act II)

1. "Death to the invader"
2. Princess Ida addresses the girls and then dismisses them
3. "I built upon a rock" (Princess)
4. The girls re-enter, shortly followed by King Gama
5. "When e'er I spoke sarcastic joke" (King Gama, Ladies' Chorus)
6. Dialogue in which the Princess agrees to let her brothers fight for her
7. "When anger spreads his wing" (Double chorus)
8. Dialogue preceding the fight
9. "This helmet, I suppose" (Arac, Guron, Scynthius, Chorus)
10. "This is our duty plain" (Chorus during the fight)
11. Dialogue and finale

As re-ordered in the 1920s, the running order is as follows:

1. "Death to the invader"
2. Princess Ida addresses the girls and then dismisses them
3. The girls re-enter, shortly followed by King Gama
4. "When e'er I spoke sarcastic joke" (King Gama, Ladies' Chorus)
5. Dialogue in which the Princess agrees to let her brothers fight for her
6. "I built upon a rock" (Princess)
7. "When anger spreads his wing" (Double chorus)
8. "This helmet, I suppose" (Arac, Guron, Scynthius, Chorus)
9. Dialogue preceding the fight
10. "This is our duty plain" (Chorus during the fight)
11. Dialogue and finale

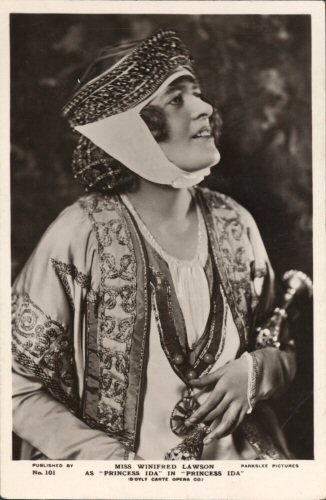
Winifred Lawson as Princess Ida, 1922

The Chappell vocal score was re-issued to conform to this revised order.

The other significant change is that, at some point in the 1920s, it became traditional to delete Lady Blanche's Act II song, "Come, mighty must" (although it continued to be printed in the vocal score). The song is included in the 1924 D'Oyly Carte recording, but on none of the three recordings the company made after that (1932, 1955, 1965).

== History of productions ==
Princess Ida was not as successful as the Gilbert and Sullivan operas that had preceded it. In the midst of the unusually hot summer of 1884, Richard D'Oyly Carte closed the Savoy Theatre for a month, starting in mid-August. The opera had been running for seven months, a short period by the partnership's past standards. The opera re-opened for just three weeks, starting in mid-September, before giving way to a revival of The Sorcerer (revised) and Trial by Jury. Gilbert designed the costumes himself. Act I and Act III sets were by the Drury Lane designer Henry Emden, while the Act II set was by Hawes Craven. A New York production ran briefly in 1884, and there was a second American production in 1887. As had happened with their earlier operas in America, Carte, Gilbert and Sullivan could do nothing to stop producers from mounting unauthorised productions, since there was no international copyright treaty at the time. The U.S. courts held that the act of publication made the opera freely available for production by anyone. In Australia, Princess Ida's first authorized performance was on 16 July 1887 at the Princess Theatre, Melbourne, produced by J. C. Williamson.

Provincial tours of Princess Ida began in early 1884 and ended by mid-1885. The opera was revived on tour in December 1895, remaining in the touring repertory through 1896. It re-appeared in late 1897 or early 1898, and from then on was never out of the D'Oyly Carte touring repertory through the early years of the twentieth century. The first London revival, however, did not come until 30 December 1919. From then on, it was included in every D'Oyly Carte touring season until the company disbanded at the outbreak of war in 1939. New costumes were designed by Percy Anderson in 1921.

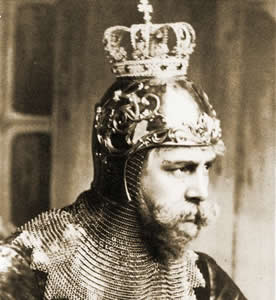
Rutland Barrington as Hildebrand, 1884

During World War II, the Company played a smaller repertory. The scenery and costumes for Princess Ida, which were in storage, were destroyed by enemy action over the winter of 1940–41. A new production was mounted at the Savoy Theatre on 27 September 1954. A guest artist, opera singer Victoria Sladen, was engaged to sing the title role for the London season. For the 1954 revival, the Act II line "And the niggers they'll be bleaching by and by," was changed to "And they'll practice what they're preaching by and by," to accommodate the sensibilities of modern audiences, following similar changes in other Gilbert and Sullivan works. After the 1954 revival, Princess Ida was an irregular presence in the D'Oyly Carte repertory. While it never went unperformed more than two or three seasons at a time, it was usually performed only in London and a few other major cities. The demands of the title role were considered unusual by Gilbert and Sullivan standards, and often the Company brought in guest artists to play it. The company's final performances of the opera were in February–April 1977. The company's reduced repertory in its final five seasons did not accommodate it.

The film director Ken Russell staged Princess Ida for English National Opera in 1992, conducted by Jane Glover. The radical contemporary concept involved an American-Japanese theme park version of Buckingham Palace, with a chorus of Madonna lookalikes (led by Rosemary Joshua as Ida) studying in the Tower of London; Gama (alternating Nickolas Grace and Richard Suart) operated a sushi chain. The production, unanimously reviled by critics, was quickly dropped from ENO's repertoire. Other professional companies have produced Princess Ida, including American Savoyards in the 1950s and 1960s, Light Opera of Manhattan in the 1970s and 1980s, New York Gilbert and Sullivan Players since the 1980s, Ohio Light Opera (which recorded the piece in 2000), the Gilbert and Sullivan Opera Company at the International Gilbert and Sullivan Festival in 2003 and 2009, and others.

The following table shows the history of the D'Oyly Carte productions in Gilbert's lifetime:

Theatre	Opening Date	Closing Date	Perfs.	Details
Savoy Theatre	5 January 1884	15 August 1884	246	First run
Savoy Theatre	15 September 1884	9 October 1884	246	First run
Fifth Avenue Theatre, New York	11 February 1884	22 March 1884	48	Authorised American productions
Fifth Avenue Theatre, New York	22 November 1887		3 wks	Authorised American productions

== Historical casting ==
The following tables show the casts of the principal original productions and D'Oyly Carte Opera Company touring repertory at various times through to the company's 1982 closure.

Role	Savoy Theatre 1884	Fifth Avenue 1884	Fifth Avenue 1887	D'Oyly Carte 1910 Tour	D'Oyly Carte 1920 Tour
King Hildebrand	Rutland Barrington	Sgr Brocolini	Sgr Brocolini	Fred Billington	Leo Sheffield
Hilarion	Henry Bracy	Wallace Macreery	Courtice Pounds	Henry Herbert	Arthur Lucas
Cyril	Durward Lely	W. S. Rising	Phil Branson	Strafford Moss	Derek Oldham
Florian	Charles Ryley	Charles F. Long	Stuart Harold	Leicester Tunks	Sydney Granville
King Gama	George Grossmith	J. H. Ryley	J. W. Herbert	Henry Lytton	Henry Lytton
Arac	Richard Temple	W. Ainsley Scott	Joseph Fay	Sydney Granville	Frederick Hobbs
Guron	Warwick Gray	James Earley	N. S. Burnham	Fred Hewett	Joe Ruff
Scynthius	William Lugg	E. J. Conley	L. W. Raymond	George Sinclair	George Sinclair
Princess Ida	Leonora Braham	Cora S. Tanner	Geraldine Ulmar	Marjorie Stone	Sylvia Cecil
Lady Blanche	Rosina Brandram	Genevieve Reynolds	Alice Carle	Bertha Lewis	Bertha Lewis
Lady Psyche	Kate Chard	Florence Bemister	Helen Lamont	Mabel Graham	Gladys Sinclair
Melissa	Jessie Bond	Hattie Delaro	Agnes Stone	Beatrice Boarer	Nellie Briercliffe
Sacharissa	Sybil Grey	Eva Barrington	Edith Jennesse	Myfanwy Newell	Nancy Ray
Chloe	Miss Heathcote	Eily Coghlan	Miss Branson	Anna Bethell	Winifred Downing
Ada	Miss Twyman	Clara Primrose	Miss McCann	Ethel Gledhill	Nell Raymond

Role	D'Oyly Carte 1929 Tour	D'Oyly Carte 1939 Tour	Savoy Theatre 1954	D'Oyly Carte 1965 Tour	Savoy Theatre 1975
King Hildebrand	Joseph Griffin	Sydney Granville	Fisher Morgan	Kenneth Sandford	Kenneth Sandford
Hilarion	Derek Oldham	John Dudley	Thomas Round	Philip Potter	Colin Wright
Cyril	Charles Goulding	John Dean	Leonard Osborn	David Palmer	Ralph Mason
Florian	Leslie Rands	Leslie Rands	Jeffrey Skitch	Alan Styler	Thomas Lawlor
King Gama	Henry Lytton	Martyn Green	Peter Pratt	John Reed	John Reed
Arac	Darrell Fancourt	Darrell Fancourt	Donald Adams	Donald Adams	John Ayldon
Guron	Richard Walker	Richard Walker	John Banks	Anthony Raffell	Michael Rayner
Scynthius	L. Radley Flynn	L. Radley Flynn	Trevor Hills	George Cook	Jon Ellison
Princess Ida	Winifred Lawson	Helen Roberts	Victoria Sladen	Ann Hood	Valerie Masterson
Lady Blanche	Bertha Lewis	Evelyn Gardiner	Ann Drummond-Grant	Christene Palmer	Lyndsie Holland
Lady Psyche	Sybil Gordon	Margery Abbott	Muriel Harding	Valerie Masterson	Julia Goss
Melissa	Nellie Briercliffe	Marjorie Eyre	Beryl Dixon	Pauline Wales	Pauline Wales
Sacharissa	Nancy Ray	Maysie Dean	Cynthia Morey	Anne Sessions	Anne Egglestone
Chloe	Beatrice Elburn	Ivy Sanders	Margaret Dobson	Jennifer Marks	Marjorie Williams
Ada	Nancy Hughes	Marjorie Flinn	Maureen Melvin	Elizabeth Mynett	Rosalind Griffiths

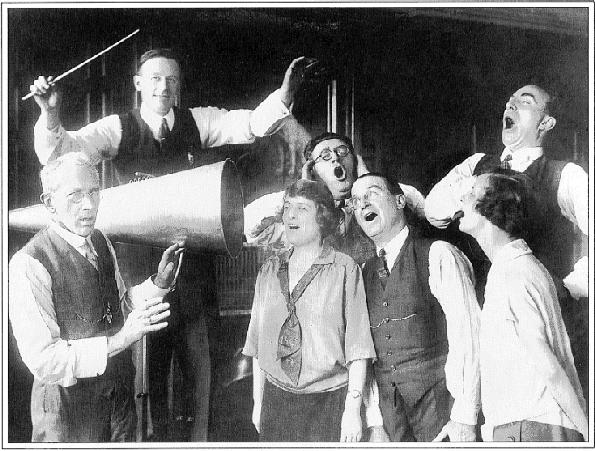
Left to right: J. M. Gordon, Norris, Lawson, Sheffield, Lytton, Eileen Sharp and Fancourt – publicity shot for the 1924 recording

== Recordings ==
Princess Ida has received fewer professional recordings than most of the Gilbert and Sullivan operas. The D'Oyly Carte Opera Company recorded the piece four times, in 1924, 1932, 1955 and 1965, but the later two recordings have not been as well received as the earlier two. The BBC broadcast the piece in 1966 and 1989, but the recordings are unavailable. Ohio Light Opera recorded the opera in 2000.

The 1982 Brent Walker Productions video is considered to be one of the weakest of the series. More recent professional productions have been recorded on video by the International Gilbert and Sullivan Festival.

- 1924 D'Oyly Carte – Conductors: Harry Norris and George W. Byng
- 1932 D'Oyly Carte – Conductor: Malcolm Sargent
- 1955 D'Oyly Carte – Conductor: Isidore Godfrey
- 2000 Ohio Light Opera – Conductor: J. Lynn Thompson
