= Winifred Lawson =

English singer and actress (1892–1961)

As Phyllis in Iolanthe, 1924

Winifred Lawson (15 November 1892 – 30 November 1961) was an English opera and concert singer in the first half of the 20th century. She is particularly remembered for her performances in the soprano roles in the Gilbert and Sullivan operas as a member of the D'Oyly Carte Opera Company between 1922 and 1932.

She started her career as a concert singer. In 1920, she made her operatic debut as Countess Almaviva in The Marriage of Figaro, appeared in the first performances of Purcell's The Fairy-Queen in more than 200 years, and created the role of Guinevere in The Round Table. Lawson was soon playing a range of roles, from as Marguerite in Faust to Bessie Throckmorton in Merrie England. She was a D'Oyly Carte principal soprano for nearly a decade, playing 10 of the leading Savoy opera roles. The only other role she played during this time was Lili in Lilac Time, although she also began a broadcast career in 1929 on BBC radio.

In the mid-1930s, Lawson appeared for two seasons with the Vic Wells Opera in The Marriage of Figaro (as Susanna), Così fan tutte (Fiordiligi), Don Giovanni (Zerlina), The Magic Flute (Genius), Pagliacci (Nedda), Faust (Marguerite), and La bohème. She next toured in Australasia in many of her old Gilbert and Sullivan roles. She retired from opera in 1938 but entertained the troops during the Second World War and continued broadcasting and recording during and after the war.

== Life and career ==
=== Early years ===
Lawson was born in Wolverhampton, the daughter of Alexander Lawson, an artist, and his wife Florence, née Thistlewood. She was educated in Wolverhampton and Vevey, Switzerland. She started her singing career as a concert performer; after a 1918 concert, The Times said, "It is becoming rare nowadays to hear a high soprano who sings perfectly in tune, with a flexible voice and without tremolo, and the pleasure is all the greater when it does come." She made her first appearance on the London opera stage in 1920 as the Countess Almaviva in The Marriage of Figaro at the Old Vic. The Times reviewer wrote that Lawson was one of three singers who "made us all feel the truth that there is nothing in the world quite so beautiful as Mozart's airs for the soprano voice".

In February 1920 Lawson appeared as principal soprano with Old Vic colleagues in the first performances of Purcell's The Fairy-Queen since the composer's lifetime, receiving praise from the leading music critic Ernest Newman. In the same year she appeared as a soloist at the Royal Albert Hall with Astra Desmond and others in the London Ballads Concerts series. She sang at Rutland Boughton's Glastonbury Festival, creating the role of Guinevere in his opera The Round Table (August 1920). Her other stage roles in 1920 and 1921 included one of the three Genii in The Magic Flute, Marguerite in Faust, the Princess in Nicholas Gatty's Prince Ferelon. and Bessie Throckmorton in Edward German's Merrie England.

=== D'Oyly Carte principal ===
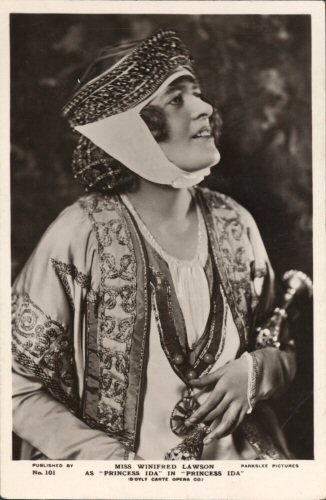
Lawson as Princess Ida, 1922

In January 1922 Lawson made her D'Oyly Carte Opera Company debut, as a guest performer during the company's London season at the Prince's Theatre in London, succeeding Sylvia Cecil in the title role of Princess Ida. The proprietor of the company, Rupert D'Oyly Carte, invited her to become a full-time member, and during the rest of the 1921–22 tour she took on the roles of Patience in Patience, Casilda in The Gondoliers and Elsie Maynard in The Yeomen of the Guard. She added the roles of Phyllis in Iolanthe in the 1922–23 season and Yum-Yum in The Mikado in July 1923. In The Gondoliers she sometimes played Gianetta rather than Casilda, and switched to the former part permanently in January 1927. In the same month she took over the role of Josephine in H.M.S. Pinafore.

At the end of the 1927–28 season Lawson suffered vocal problems that caused her to leave the company temporarily and undergo surgery. She made a complete recovery but was not able to return to singing until later in 1928, by which time the company had departed for an eight-month tour of Canada. She toured Britain in the role of Lili in Lilac Time before rejoining D'Oyly Carte on the company's return in June 1929. Lawson took on the role of Aline in The Sorcerer, and during the 1930–31 tour she appeared for the first time as Rose Maybud in Ruddigore. She left D'Oyly Carte in June 1931 to look after her mother, who was unwell. On her return in February 1932 she appeared as Patience, Phyllis, Ida, Yum-Yum, and Casilda, until June of that year when she left the company for the last time.

With the D'Oyly Carte Opera Company, she recorded five of her roles: Princess Ida (1924), Gianetta (1927), Elsie Maynard (1928), Phyllis (1929) and Patience (1930). She also recorded the Plaintiff in Trial by Jury (1927), though she never played the part on stage.

=== Later years ===
On the death of her mother in 1933, Lawson returned to the stage, appearing for two seasons with the Vic Wells Opera in four Mozart operas: The Marriage of Figaro (as Susanna), Così fan tutte (Fiordiligi), Don Giovanni (Zerlina) and The Magic Flute (Genius); she also appeared in Pagliacci (Nedda), Faust (Marguerite), and La bohème. In 1935 she toured Australia and New Zealand, appearing in many of the Gilbert and Sullivan soprano roles with the J. C. Williamson Gilbert and Sullivan Opera Company.

In 1938 Lawson reprised the role of the Countess in The Marriage of Figaro at the Open Air Theatre, Regent's Park, London. This was her last appearance on the London stage. During the Second World War she sang in many concerts and toured the Middle East for ENSA.

Lawson was an experienced broadcaster, having made the first of her many BBC broadcasts in 1929. During the war she presented a series of programmes for the armed forces network, mixing reminiscence and musical extracts. After the war she took part as principal soprano in Leslie Baily's six-part dramatised biography of Gilbert and Sullivan. In 1947 she played Angelina in two BBC radio broadcasts of Cherubini's 1800 opera Les deux journées, conducted by Sir Thomas Beecham.

In 1944 Lawson was elected vice-president of the Gilbert and Sullivan Society and frequently joined Society meetings and events. Her autobiography, A Song to Sing-O!, with foreword by Sir Malcolm Sargent, was published by Michael Joseph in 1955. The Times said that the book "gives a delightful picture of those happy days in the operas, with Henry Lytton, Bertha Lewis, Leo Sheffield and Darrell Fancourt".

Lawson died in London on 30 November 1961 at the age of 69.

== Sources ==
- Parker, John, ed. (1939). Who's Who in the Theatre (ninth ed.). London: Sir Isaac Pitman and Sons. OCLC 473894893.
- Rollins, Cyril; R. John Witts (1962). The D'Oyly Carte Opera Company in Gilbert and Sullivan Operas: A Record of Productions, 1875–1961. London: Michael Joseph. OCLC 504581419.
- Wearing, J. P. (2014). The London Stage 1930–1939 : A Calendar of Productions, Performers, and Personnel. Lanham: Rowman & Littlefield. ISBN 978-0-8108-9304-7.
