= Eileen Sharp =

English singer and actress (1900–1958)

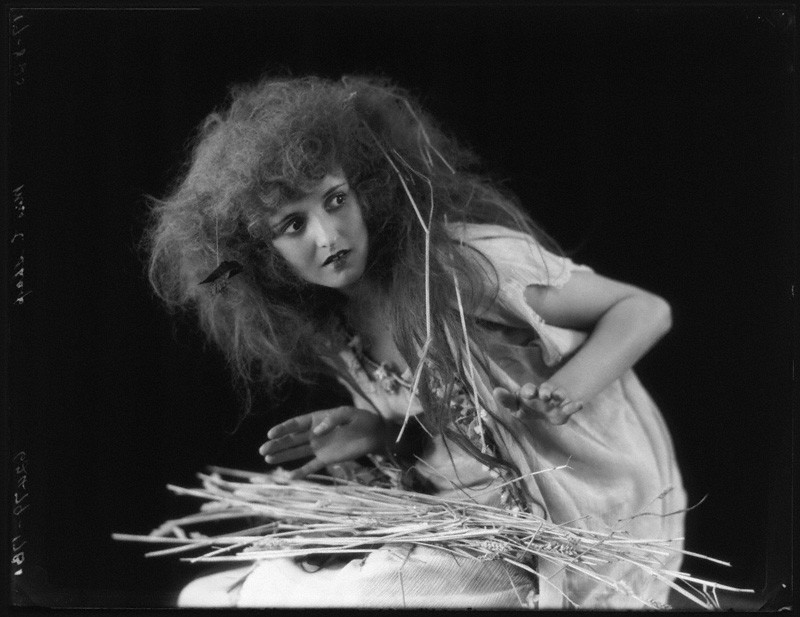
Sharp as Mad Margaret in Ruddigore (1923)

Eileen Nora Sharp (20 September 1900 – 25 March 1958) was an English singer and actress who was the principal mezzo-soprano with the D'Oyly Carte Opera Company from 1923 to 1925. For a few years after that, she continued to act in the West End and on tour, but she left the stage after marrying in 1928, making some radio and television appearances in the 1930s.

== Early life and D'Oyly Carte ==
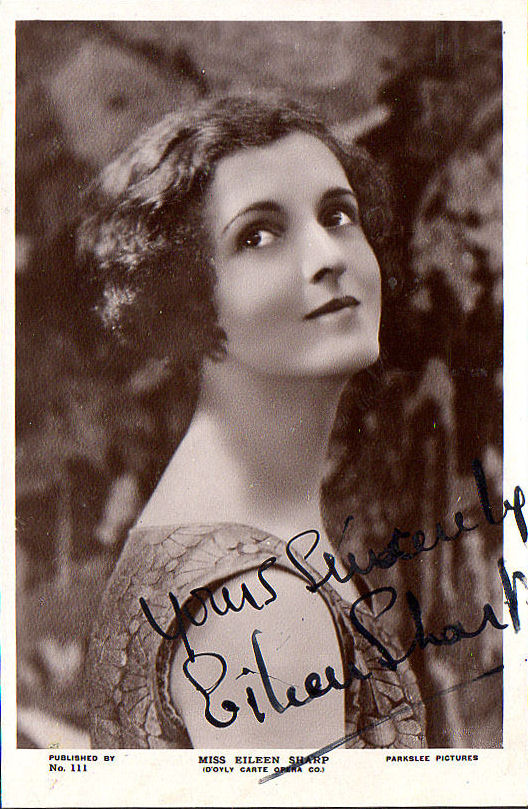
Sharp in a 1922 postcard

Sharp was born in Brighton in 1900, the daughter of Louisa Jane (née Newman; 1869–1911) and Ernest Alfred Sharp (1867–c. 1918), a coal factor. Her older brother, Ernest Granville Sharp (c. 1896–1916), was killed in the Battle of Gommecourt in 1916. After studying at the Royal College of Music in London, where she was awarded a scholarship, Sharp made her stage debut in December 1921 in The Lady of the Rose at the Prince's Theatre in Manchester in a chorus role.

In March 1922, at the age of 21, Sharp was engaged by the D'Oyly Carte Opera Company and was immediately cast in the small roles of Kate in The Pirates of Penzance, the fairy Leila in Iolanthe, Peep-Bo in The Mikado, Ruth in Ruddigore and Vittoria in The Gondoliers. From August 1922 to mid-1923 she continued to play all of these roles, adding another small part, Saphir in Patience, to her repertoire. She also understudied principal mezzo-soprano Catherine Ferguson, occasionally playing her parts: Constance in The Sorcerer, Cousin Hebe in H.M.S. Pinafore, Edith in Pirates, Angela in Patience, the title role in Iolanthe, Melissa in Princess Ida, Pitti-Sing in The Mikado, Margaret in Ruddigore, Phoebe in The Yeomen of the Guard and Tessa in The Gondoliers. When Ferguson left the company in July 1923 Sharp became the company's principal mezzo-soprano, playing these parts (originally excepting Edith, which she took on from August 1924), performing them in repertory until June 1925, and becoming popular with audiences.

Sharp's appearance and acting won praise from reviewers, although her singing came in for criticism. Writing in The Savoyard, R. F. Bourne said of her performance as Mad Margaret in Ruddigore:

Her interpretation of Margaret was a scintillating one, from her electrifying entrance in Act 1 and her tender and pathetic "To a Garden Full of Posies", to her scarcely controlled primness in "I Once Was a Very Abandoned Person", succeeded by her repeated outbursts in the dialogue which followed.

She recorded two of her roles with D'Oyly Carte for His Master's Voice: Mad Margaret in Ruddigore (1924) and Melissa in Princess Ida (1925).

== Later years ==
Publicity shot: Henry Ainley and Sharp in The Moon and Sixpence (1925)

Sharp left the D'Oyly Carte Opera Company in 1925, and during the next few years she appeared in several London productions and on tour. In 1925 she played the maid in The Show at St. Martin's Theatre, Ata in an adaptation of The Moon and Sixpence at the New Theatre and Posy (from 1925 to 1926) in Quinney's at the New Theatre. Later in 1926 she was Myriem in Prince Fazil at the New Theatre, and in 1927 she played Adrienne in Noël Coward's The Marquise at the Criterion Theatre. Of her appearance in The Marquise, co-star Godfrey Winn wrote:

It is always an ordeal to have the opening scene to play on the first night, but on this occasion [the scene was] greatly assisted by the gay bubbling insouciance of [Sharp]. Eileen Sharp was so pretty and unspoilt that I would have imagined that no one could have found fault with her, but unfortunately she was an incorrigible giggler, and we were both reported for this heinous crime in one of our scenes together.

In 1928 Sharp played Penelope Hillcourt in Down Wind at the Arts Theatre. The same year she married Dr. Douglas Clive Shields (1902–1976), a Scottish consultant physician, in Paddington in London. They had two sons: Bryan Douglas Clive Shields (born 1933) and Rodney Mark Shields (born 1935). In 1938 she appeared as Mavis Wilson in Love from a Stranger, a live BBC Television play directed by George More O'Ferrall. She also acted in several BBC Radio dramas during the 1930s.

Sharp died of a brain haemorrhage in Wimbledon in 1958, aged 57. She was buried in the Shields family grave at Kensal Green Cemetery in London. In her will she left £458 1s 4d to her husband.

== Sources ==
- Rollins, Cyril; R. John Witts (1962). The D'Oyly Carte Opera Company in Gilbert and Sullivan Operas: A Record of Productions, 1875–1961. London: Michael Joseph. OCLC 504581419.
