= Howard Paul =

Howard Paul may refer to:

- Henry Howard Paul, Victorian era actor and theatre manager, with the stage name Howard Paul
  - Mrs Howard Paul, Victorian actress and singer who was married for a time to Henry Howard Paul
- Howard R. Paul, American businessman and musician
