= Robert Brisco Earée =

English priest and philatelist (1846–1928)

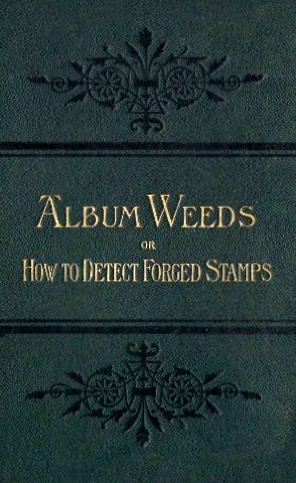
Cover of the 3rd edition of Album Weeds, 1906

Robert Brisco Earée (1846–1928) was an English priest and philatelist who was known for his studies of philatelic fakes and forgeries.

== Life ==
A son of the Reverend William Earée, the young Robert Brisco Earée was educated at Cockermouth Grammar School, a boys' school in Cumberland. He was ordained as a priest in 1871 and was appointed as curate at Coggeshall, Essex, in the same year.

He married Florence Isabella Goff, daughter of Captain A. Goff (deceased), at Alphamstone, Essex, in August 1876. His father had been rector at Alphamstone since 1870.

While British chaplain in Berlin in the 1880s, Earée was responsible for raising a fund for a new church dedicated to St George.

In 1884, his sister Ada Earée, a singer known professionally as Ada Dorée, married the singer Eric Thorne.

In 1890 Earée was inducted as Rector of Miserden in Gloucestershire.

== Philatelic work ==
Earée followed W. Dudley Atlee and Edward Loines Pemberton as the author of a series of articles, The Spud Papers, describing forgeries which appeared in various publications between 1871 and 1881 before being published in book form in 1952. He also served as philatelic editor of The Bazaar [1875].

Earée is best known for the classic work Album Weeds; or, How to Detect Forged Stamps, which went through three editions, numerous reprints, and is still regarded as one of the best all world guides to earlier forgeries and fakes ever produced. He summed up his philosophy in The Spud Papers by saying "if philatelists would only study their stamps a little more, instead of merely trying to see how many they can collect, I am certain that they would soon learn for themselves far more than any book or Spud Paper can teach them."

Earée was entered on the Roll of Distinguished Philatelists in 1921.

== Publications ==
- Album Weeds; or, How to Detect Forged Stamps, 1st edition, Stanley Gibbons Limited, London 1882. (One volume)
- "The Future of Stamp Collecting" in Nunn’s Philatelical Annual, circa 1889. Reproduced here. Archived here.
- Album Weeds; or, How to Detect Forged Stamps, 2nd edition, Stanley Gibbons Limited, London 1892. (One volume)
- Album Weeds; or, How to Detect Forged Stamps, 3rd edition, Stanley Gibbons Limited, London 1906. (Two volumes)
- Album Weeds; or, How to Detect Forged Stamps, The Gossip Printery, Holton, Kansas, U.S.A. 1931. (Reprint)
- The Spud Papers: An Illustrated Descriptive Catalogue of Early Philatelic Forgeries, 1952. (With W. Dudley Atlee and Edward Loines Pemberton. Introduction by Lowell Ragatz.)
- Album Weeds; or, How to Detect Forged Stamps, 3rd edition, Lowell Ragatz & Jim Beal, United States. (Reprint 1954 and 1975?)
- Album Weeds; or, How to Detect Forged Stamps, 3rd edition, Manuka-Ainslie Press, Acton, Canberra, Australia. (Reprint, eight paperback parts circa 1960.)

== See also ==
- Fernand Serrane, a contemporary of Earee's who produced a later forgery guide.
