= Ada Dorée =

English singer and actor

Ada Dorée (1850 – 28 April 1916) was an English singer and actor who performed in operetta, Victorian burlesque, and pantomime from the 1870s to the 1890s. In her early life she was Ada Catherine Elizabeth Earée, and in her later years she used the name Ada Dorée-Thorne, adding that of her husband.

== Life and career ==
Dorée was born in Cockermouth, Cumberland, in 1850, as Ada Earée, the daughter of William Earée, a Church of England clergyman, and trained as a singer at the Guildhall School of Music, on a scholarship. She sang with groups known as the Philothespians and the South Kensington Amateurs before gaining professional roles in operetta, Victorian burlesque, and pantomime between the 1870s and the 1890s.

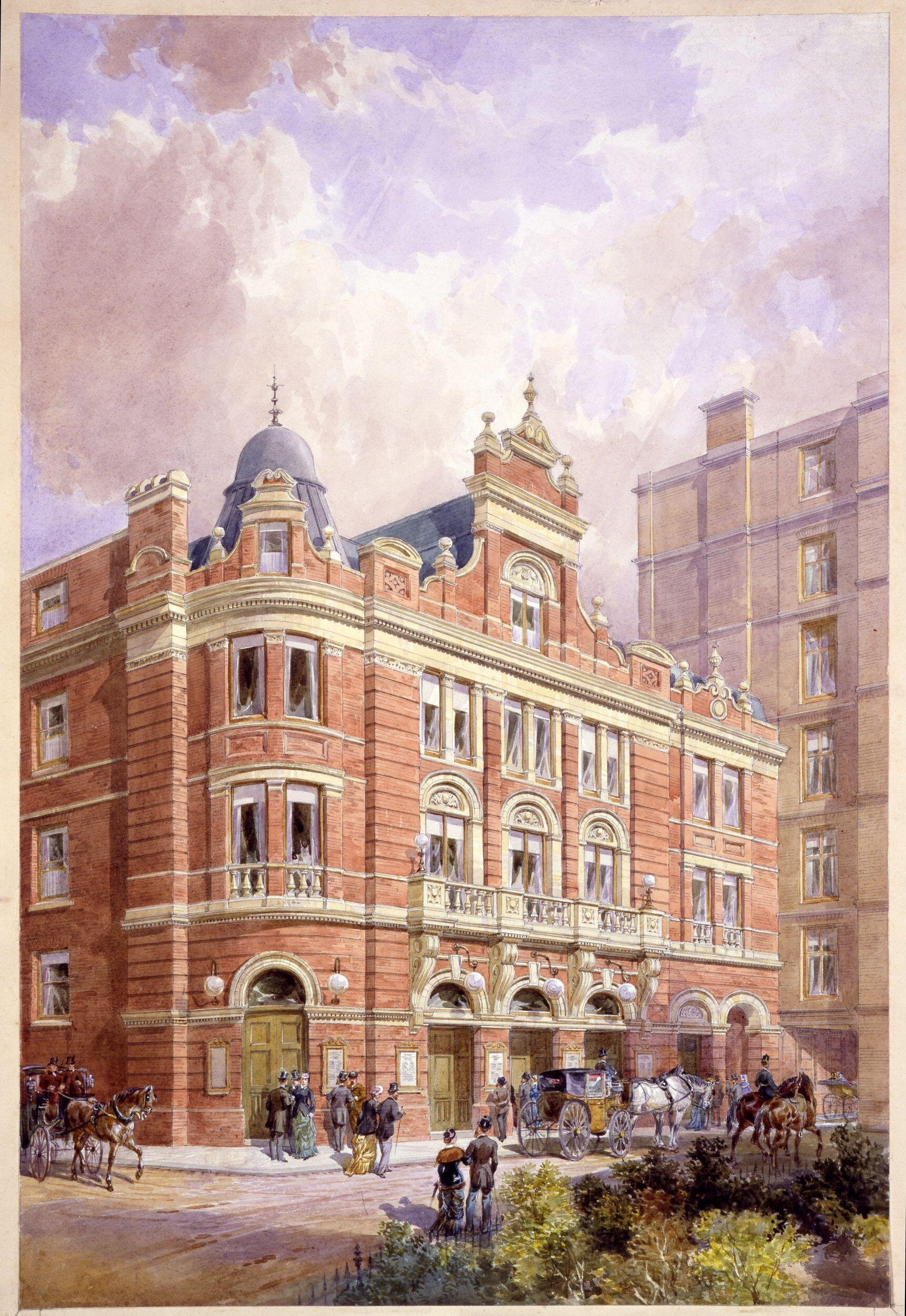
The Savoy Theatre in 1881

In February 1884, Dorée joined a D'Oyly Carte touring company playing the contralto role of Lady Blanche in Gilbert and Sullivan's Princess Ida. In August of that year, at Portsea, she married another member of the company, Eric Thorne; after the Banns of marriage had been published for Frederick Thomas Thorne "of this parish", and Ada Catherine Elizabeth Earée, of Alphamstone. Her father was by then the Rector there, and her brother, Robert Brisco Earée was also a clergyman.

In October 1884, D'Oyly Carte revived The Sorcerer at the Savoy Theatre, and Dorée was sent there to perform the secondary contralto part, Mrs Partlett. She continued with this until March 1885, then took the same role on tour until 9 May, when the production closed and Dorée left the D'Oyly Carte Opera Company. Dorée's daughter Gladys Edith Hilda Earée Thorne was born at Alphamstone on 17 June 1885 and was baptized there a few weeks later.

Dorée remained active in musical theatre. In the spring of 1888, she and Thorne both played in a touring production of The Punch Bowl, a musical comedy about a prince who believes he is invisible. In September of the same year, they both appeared in Carina at the Opera Comique in Westminster, and in 1889 both performed in Faddimar at the Vaudeville Theatre. In the autumn of 1889, Dorée toured with Auguste van Biene in Faust up to Date. She was in a pantomime at the Prince of Wales Theatre in 1890–1891, Faust up to Date again at the Gaiety Theatre in 1892, The Piper of Hamelin, A Modern Don Quixote, and Masters Sandford and Merton in 1893, and the burlesque Jaunty Jane Shore in 1894.

In 1904, as "Madam Ada Dorée", she was left an annuity, and a pony and trap, in the will of Thomas Craigie Glover, of Edinburgh, to thank her for looking after him following the death of his wife in 1895. On 2 April 1911, as Ada Dorée-Thorne, she made a Census return for 4, Wharfedale Street, Earl's Court, stating herself as head of the household, living on a "small annuity". With her was her unmarried daughter Gladys Dorée-Thorne, one servant, the servant's husband, and a visitor.

== Death and aftermath ==
On 28 April 1916, Dorée died at St Saviour's Hospital, St Pancras, London, aged 66, leaving an estate valued at £1,589, with her daughter as executor.

Within a few weeks, her husband married again. In 1922, he died at a nursing home in Marylebone, leaving an estate valued for probate at £10,968 equivalent to £538,856 in 2025.

Their daughter Gladys remained unmarried and died at the age of 94 in Worthing, on 22 December 1979. Probate was granted in the name of Gladys Edith Hilda Earee Doree-Thorne.
