= Eric Thorne =

English singer and actor

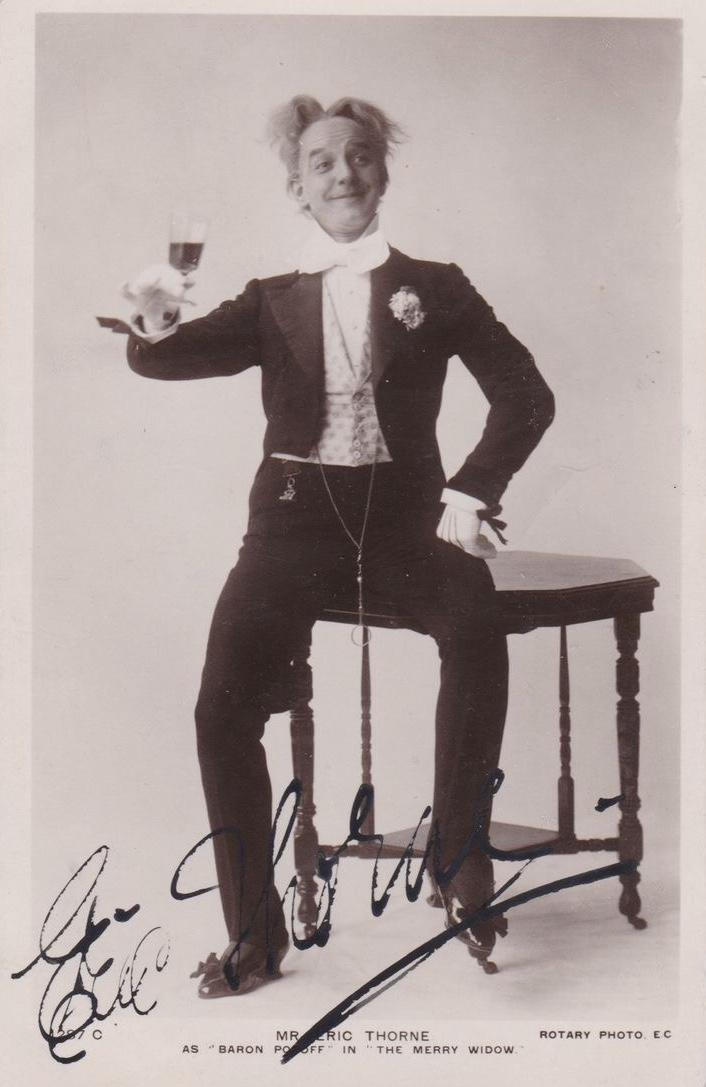
Thorne as Baron Popoff in The Merry Widow

Frederick Thomas Thorne (1862 – 26 November 1922), stage name Eric Thorne, was an English singer and actor in musical theatre and comic opera.

His professional career began in 1884 with the D'Oyly Carte Opera Company where he worked for almost two years, and then he played roles for more than a decade at London theatres in plays, operettas and Edwardian musical comedies such as In Town and Gentleman Joe. From 1897, he became better known on tour, especially as Hilarius in La Poupée, Baron Popoff in The Merry Widow and Mr. Bulgar in The Dollar Princess. He was still performing in the early 1920s.

== Career ==
In February 1884, Thorne joined the chorus of a D'Oyly Carte Opera Company touring company. In the summer of that year, while the company performed at Portsea, he married another member of the company, Ada Dorée. In March 1885, Thorne briefly performed the role of King Hildebrand in Gilbert and Sullivan's Princess Ida, and in May he was given the part of Florian in that production, and in The Sorcerer he added the role of Sir Marmaduke Pointdextre. In June 1885, H.M.S. Pinafore was added to the company's repertoire, and Thorne was cast as Dick Deadeye. He left the D'Oyly Carte Opera Company in December 1885.

In early 1888, Thorne played the part of the Lord Chamberlain in a touring production of The Punch Bowl, a musical comedy about a prince who believes he is invisible. In September of the same year, he appeared in Carina at the Opera Comique in London.

On 29 April 1889, Thorne opened at the Vaudeville Theatre in the comic opera Faddimir, playing the lead part of Faddimir the First, with his wife also in the company. In July 1890, he played Wilson in Brander Matthews's melodrama A Gold Mine at the Gaiety Theatre, which closed in August. In 1892, he shared the role of the Duke of Duffshire in the musical In Town at the Prince of Wales's Theatre.

Between March 1895 and March 1896, Thorne had a long run in Gentleman Joe at the Prince of Wales's, originating the role of Dawson, then from April to June 1896 performed the part of General Tomassino in Jerome K. Jerome's Biarritz, at the same theatre.

On 11 September 1897, Thorne played Hilarius, the dollmaker, in a single matinee performance of La Poupée at the Prince of Wales, which was to launch a provincial tour, an unusual event arranged at the suggestion of Henry Lowenfeld. He continued in the part for several years; in 1899, the Musical News reported that "Miss Stella Gastelle and Mr Eric Thorne, as Alesia and Hilarius, are still delightful in the two principal parts". In 1905, The Oxford Magazine gave both Thorne and Gastelle warm reviews for the show; and an obituary stated that Thorne played for eight years in the part. However, Thorne also sang other roles during those years.

Over the ensuing decades, Thorne continued to make a name for himself in musical theatre on tour in Britain, and he also worked overseas, in France, Holland, Germany, Belgium, and the United States. He played leading parts in The Casino Girl, The Lady Dandies, The Little Michus, and A Waltz Dream.

In 1908, Thorne was Baron Popoff in a touring production of The Merry Widow, and his performance, "clothed by his characteristic gesture and mannerism", was praised in the Yorkshire Evening Post. A later theatre history comments that "Thorne made a big hit on tour in George Graves' part of Baron Popoff in The Merry Widow." Between 1909 and 1910, he toured in a George Edwardes production of The Dollar Princess as Mr Bulgar, with the Leeds Mercury reporting that he "gagged with conspicuous daring and success".

In 1912, Thorne played the part of Grand Duke Rutzinov in a production of Franz Lehár's The Count of Luxembourg, as one of the five principals, together with Daisy Burrell, Lauri de Frece, Robert Michaelis and Phyllis Le Grand, who were collectively described by the Musical News as "all consummate artists in their own style". Between February and September 1913, Thorne starred on tour in Robert Courtneidge's Princess Caprice, and from January to March 1914 he was in P. G. Wodehouse's revue Nuts and Wine at the Empire Theatre, Leicester Square. In March 1915, Thorne played the principal role of Richard Thistle in the musical comedy Rosebuds, at the Palace Theatre, Bath. From 1920 to 1921, he performed in The Little Dutch Girl at the Prince's Theatre, Bristol.

D. Forbes-Winslow's Daly's: the Biography of a Theatre (1944), states that "Thorne was a great favourite in the provinces" and adds that he was "certainly a great comedian". An obituary in the Leeds Mercury on 29 November 1922 said of him:

London knew of, but did not know, Eric Thorne, the provinces did. For some reason, he never made good as a permanent "West Ender" in the theatrical world, though his artistry, always unfailing and resourceful, fully entitled him to a front rank.

== Private life ==
Thorne married Ada Earée, whose stage name was Ada Dorée, in Portsea in August 1884. Her father, William Earée, was a Church of England clergyman, and the Banns of marriage were published three times in July in the names of Frederick Thomas Thorne "of this parish", and Ada Catherine Elizabeth Earée, of Alphamstone. Her father was the Rector there. Ada was born in Cockermouth, Cumberland, in 1850, and trained at the Guildhall School of Music, going on to sing roles in operetta, Victorian burlesque, and pantomime between the 1870s and the 1890s.

The couple's daughter Gladys Edith Hilda Earée Thorne was born at Alphamstone on 17 June 1885. Her parents' names were stated for the christening as Frederic Thorne and Ada Catherine Elizabeth Thorne. On 2 April 1911, as Ada Dorée-Thorne, his wife made a Census return for 4, Wharfedale Street, Earl's Court, stating herself as head of the household. With her was her unmarried daughter Gladys Dorée-Thorne and a visitor. On 28 April 1916, Ada died at St Saviour's Hospital, St Pancras, London, aged 66.

Within a few weeks, Thorne married again, in Brentford, to Katie Seager Murdoch, also known as Sybil. She died in 1936 with an address in Marylebone. Thorne died on 26 November 1922 at a nursing home in Marylebone. His home address was stated as Castletown Road, West Kensington. He left an estate valued for probate at £10,968, equivalent to £756,502 in 2023.

Thorne's daughter Gladys remained unmarried and died at the age of 94 in Worthing on 22 December 1979. Probate was granted in the amount of £4,860, in the name of Gladys Edith Hilda Earee Doree-Thorne.
