= A Lovely Way to Die =

1968 film by David Lowell Rich

- Theatrical poster
- Directed by: David Lowell Rich
- Written by: A.J. Russell
- Produced by: Richard Lewis
- Starring: Kirk Douglas; Sylva Koscina; Eli Wallach
- Cinematography: Morris Hantzband
- Edited by: Sidney Katz; Gene Palmer
- Music by: Kenyon Hopkins
- Production company: Universal Pictures
- Distributed by: Universal Pictures
- Release dates: July 12, 1968 (New York City); August 25, 1968 (Los Angeles)
- Running time: 104 minutes
- Country: United States
- Language: English

A Lovely Way to Die is a 1968 American crime neo noir directed by David Lowell Rich and starring Kirk Douglas, Sylva Koscina, Eli Wallach and Kenneth Haigh.

A police officer resigns from the force and becomes a bodyguard to the wife of a wealthy man. When her husband is found dead, he tries to clear her of murder.

The film marks the film debut of Ali MacGraw in a walk-on role.

== Plot ==
After quitting his job as a police detective, Jim Schuyler accepts an offer from lawyer Tennessee Fredericks to protect Rena Westabrook, who is about to be placed on trial for the murder of her wealthy husband.

Rena is accused of conspiring with a lover, Jonathan Fleming, to kill Westabrook for his money. She has an alibi from Sean Magruder, who says that he witnessed her in a bar at the time of the murder, but Schuyler finds Magruder dead in a car.

A gang responsible for the death of a British man named Finchley appears to be behind the murders of Westabrook and Magruder as well. Rena is the next target after being acquitted in court, but Schuyler heroically saves her life.

== Cast ==
- Kirk Douglas as Jim Schuyler
- Sylva Koscina as Rena Westabrook
- Eli Wallach as "Tennessee" Fredericks
- Kenneth Haigh as Jonathan Fleming
- Martyn Green as Finchley
- Sharon Farrell as Carol
- Ruth White as Biddy, The Cook
- Philip Bosco as Fuller
- Ralph Waite as Sean Magruder
- Meg Myles as Mrs. Magruder
- William Roerick as Loren Westabrook
- Dana Elcar as Layton
- Dolph Sweet as Captain Haver
- Dee Victor as Mrs. Gordon
- Lincoln Kilpatrick as Daley
- Marty Glickman as Racetrack Announcer
- Ali MacGraw as Melody
- Richard S. Castellano as The Bartender (uncredited)
- Leslie Charleson as Julie

== Reception ==
In a contemporary review for The New York Times, critic Vincent Canby wrote: "There is so little of real interest in this movie—even philandering and luxury look dull—that the mind clutches at irrelevancies, such as the fact that as Mr. Douglas grows older, the dimple in his chin begins to look more and more like a surgical mistake."

== See also ==
- List of American films of 1968
