= Martyn Green =

English singer and actor (1899–1975)

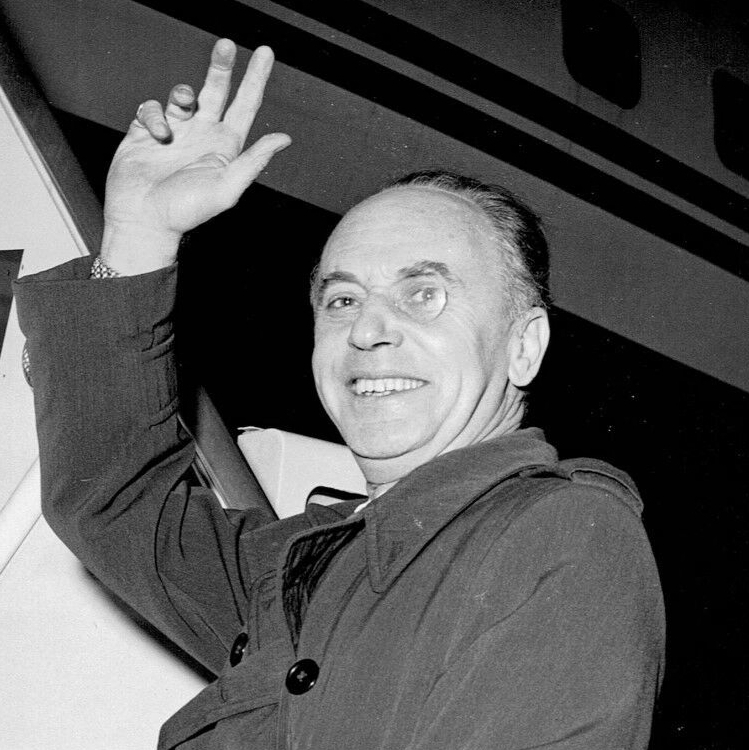
Martyn Green in 1960

William Martin Green (22 April 1899 – 8 February 1975), known by his stage name, Martyn Green, was an English actor and singer. He is remembered for his performances and recordings as principal comedian of the D'Oyly Carte Opera Company, in the leading patter roles of the Gilbert and Sullivan comic operas in the 1930s and 1940s, and for his career in America from the 1950s to the 1970s.

After army service in World War I, Green studied singing and began to perform in musical theatre. In 1922 he joined the D'Oyly Carte Opera Company, playing in the chorus and in an increasing number of small-to-medium sized roles, while understudying, and often substituting for, the company's principal comedian. Beginning in 1931, he was regularly given the roles of Major-General Stanley in The Pirates of Penzance and Robin Oakapple in Ruddigore. In 1934, Green became the principal comedian, playing all the famous Gilbert and Sullivan patter roles, including Sir Joseph in H.M.S. Pinafore, the Major-General in Pirates, Bunthorne in Patience, the Lord Chancellor in Iolanthe, Ko-Ko in The Mikado, Jack Point in The Yeomen of the Guard and the Duke of Plaza Toro in The Gondoliers, among others.

At the beginning of World War II, Green left the D'Oyly Carte organisation and acted in other companies. In 1941, he joined the Royal Air Force, serving until 1945. He soon rejoined D'Oyly Carte and continued as the principal comedian until 1951. He then left the company again and moved to New York City, where he continued his career in musicals and plays on Broadway, television, recordings and films. In 1959, his left leg was crushed in a garage elevator and had to be amputated below the knee. Greatly determined, Green was soon acting and directing again using a prosthetic limb. He continued to act and direct for the rest of his life and had a variety of film roles, notably in A Lovely Way to Die (1968) and The Iceman Cometh (1973).

== Life and career ==
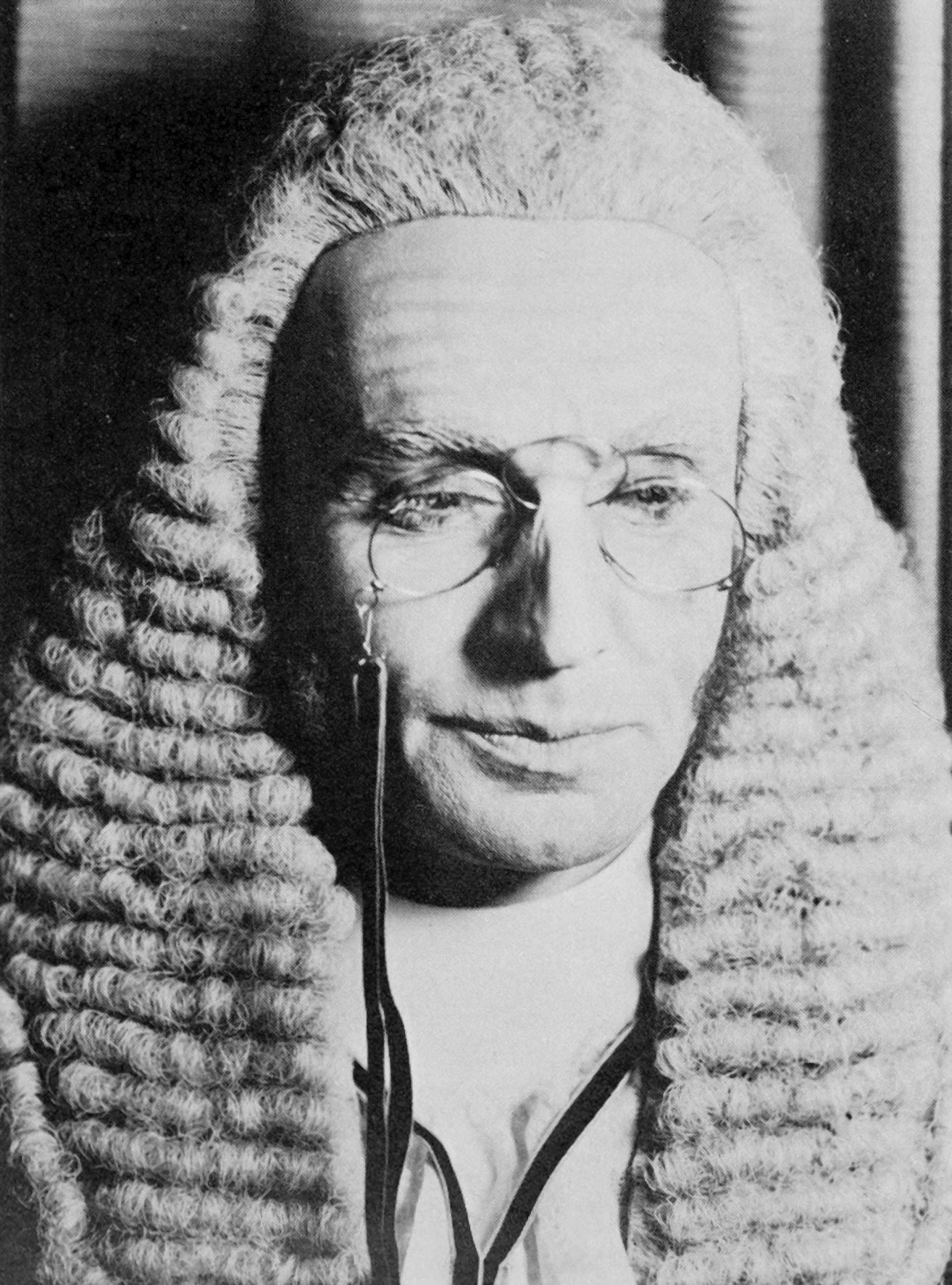
Green as the Lord Chancellor in Iolanthe

William Martin Green was born in Shepherd's Bush, London. His father, William Green (1868–1920), a tenor concert singer, was his first singing teacher, and his mother was Sarah Ann, née Martin (b. 1869). Both parents were from Bolton, Lancashire; Green was the third of their four children. Green was educated at Latymer Upper School. When his elder brother Alexander died, Green left school and was apprenticed to a draper in Wigan from 1914 to 1915, but he was unhappy there and was eager to join the army. After two attempts to enlist while underage, he eventually served in the army, becoming an army drummer and fighting in France during World War I. In 1918, he was wounded in his left leg by shrapnel and was discharged in 1919.

Green's first stage appearance was in Nottingham in early 1919 in the chorus of A Southern Maid. The same year, he toured briefly in more Edwardian musical comedies for the George Edwardes Company, then run by Robert Evett, and soon received a scholarship to the Royal College of Music, studying singing with Gustave Garcia. He also studied elocution with Cairns James, a former singer with the D'Oyly Carte Opera Company. He left the Royal College in 1921 and soon appeared in the provinces in the revue Shuffle Along. His first appearance in London was at the London Palladium in Thirty Minutes of Melody in September 1921. The following year, he sang in variety at the Palladium before playing his first major role, Paul Petrov, the romantic lead in a provincial tour of the operetta Sybil, again with an Edwardes company. After the tour, in which he used the stage name W. Martyn-Green, he decided on the simpler Martyn Green.

=== Pre-war D'Oyly Carte years ===
Green joined D'Oyly Carte's "New Company" (its second touring company) late in 1922 as a chorus member and occasional principal. His first role there was Luiz in The Gondoliers the same year. In July 1923 he was made understudy to Frank Steward, the New Company's principal comic baritone. While taking on some smaller roles on a regular basis, such as Antonio in The Gondoliers, the Associate and then Counsel in Trial by Jury, he also had the opportunity to perform many of the leading patter roles, as understudy, playing the Learned Judge in Trial, Sir Joseph Porter in H.M.S. Pinafore, the Lord Chancellor in Iolanthe, Ko-Ko in The Mikado, and the Duke of Plaza-Toro in The Gondoliers. In 1924, he added the roles of Mr. Cox in Cox and Box and First Citizen in The Yeomen of the Guard to his regular repertory and soon added Pish-Tush in The Mikado.

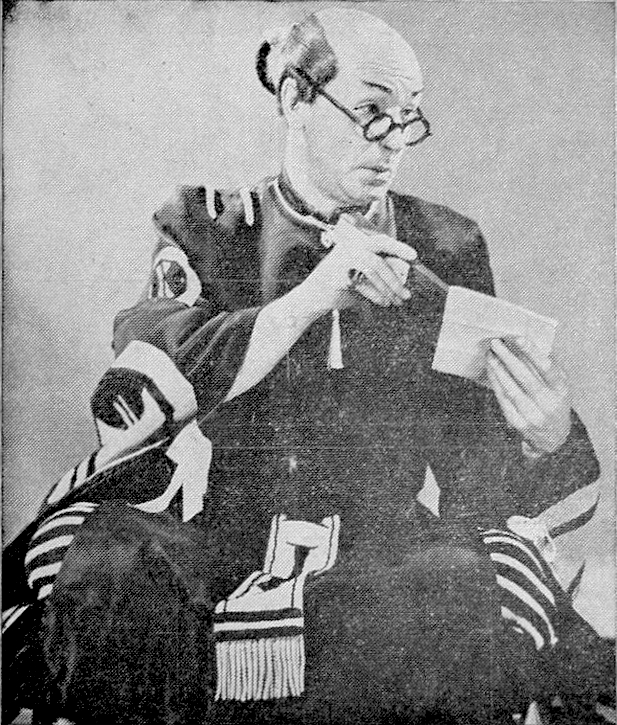
Green as Ko-Ko in The Mikado

In 1925, Green was promoted to the main repertory company, becoming the understudy to the long-time leading comedian Henry Lytton. There, he also regularly played the roles of Cox, the Associate, Major Murgatroyd in Patience, and Luiz (and sometimes Antonio). Beginning in 1927, he added the role of the Usher in Trial by Jury. On occasion, he substituted for Lytton as Major-General Stanley in The Pirates of Penzance and also filled in from time to time as Florian in Princess Ida, Giuseppe in The Gondoliers and Counsel in Trial. By the 1928–30 seasons, in addition to singing these smaller baritone roles, Green had a chance to fill in for Lytton from time to time in all the patter roles, including General Stanley, Bunthorne in Patience, the Lord Chancellor, Ko-Ko, Robin Oakapple in Ruddigore, Jack Point in Yeomen and the Duke of Plaza-Toro. He sang the part of Mr. Cox in a 1929 BBC radio broadcast.

In 1931, Lytton was injured in a car accident in which D'Oyly Carte principal contralto Bertha Lewis received fatal injuries. Green took over Lytton's nine patter roles until Lytton's return about two months later. Afterwards, two of the roles – Major-General Stanley in Pirates and Robin Oakapple in Ruddigore – were assigned to Green permanently in 1932. He also began substituting more frequently for Lytton in the role of Jack Point. In 1934, Lytton's retirement left Green as the principal comedian of the D'Oyly Carte company, playing all of the comic roles in their repertory over the next five years, which included London seasons and extended British and American tours. Green gained enthusiastic notices for, among other things, his excellent diction and comedic stage movement, despite the World War I injury to his knee. Green finally added John Wellington Wells in The Sorcerer to his long list of roles when the company revived that work in 1938, and he appeared in the film version of The Mikado in the role of Ko-Ko in 1939. Green was a slim song-and-dance man who could make audiences laugh with a mere "twitch of a toe... [or] punctilious verbal articulation, nasally pompous", while bringing elements of seriousness and pathos to some of the roles. His director in the film, Victor Schertzinger, said of Green: "He has that special sort of comedian's quality that only Chaplin has so far developed to perfection. He can make you laugh and cry at the same moment."

=== War and later D'Oyly Carte years ===
In September 1939, at the outbreak of World War II, the British government ordered all theatres to close indefinitely. Rupert D'Oyly Carte cancelled the company's entire autumn tour and terminated the contracts of all of his performers. Green arranged, as soon as possible, for an engagement with Charles B. Cochran to appear in the Noel Gay revue Lights Up at the Savoy Theatre. On Christmas Day 1939, the D'Oyly Carte resumed performing, and since Green was not available, they engaged Grahame Clifford to play Green's roles. After the Cochran review, Green appeared with other companies, including touring with Sylvia Cecil in variety halls in their act, "Words with Music," which included Gilbert and Sullivan songs. He then joined the Royal Air Force, serving as an instructor and administrator in Canada, California and India from 1941 to 1945.

Green returned to the D'Oyly Carte Opera Company in 1946 as principal comedian for another five years. During this time, he recorded most of the Gilbert and Sullivan patter roles in the earliest D'Oyly Carte LP recordings. For a generation of Gilbert and Sullivan fans, his performances in those recordings were considered definitive. Billboard wrote, during the company's 1948 US tour, that his performance of Jack Point "is another triumph. ... a G. and S. portrait to be cherished". In this second stint with the company, Green became impatient with artistic and commercial decisions of the company, including the postponement of some recordings, which led to friction with the management. In 1949, soon after Bridget D'Oyly Carte inherited the company, she appointed Eleanor Evans (known in the company as "Snookie") as Stage Director and Director of Productions to replace Anna Bethell (Mrs. Sydney Granville). The choice of the temperamental Snookie, a former chorister with the company and wife of the company's longtime principal bass Darrell Fancourt, was a highly unpopular one and contributed to a wave of defections from the company, including Green's departure in 1951. He wrote:

I had heard there was some possibility of [the selection of Evans] happening and ... told Miss Carte that I thought she was making a great psychological error. During Anna Bethell's regime... there had been growing signs of discontent and suggestions of favouritism being shown to some of the members of the chorus in respect to passing over existing understudies, selections for small parts, and so on. ... But to appoint not only a woman who had for fifteen years worked in the chorus alongside several who were now principals, but the wife of one of the main principals, seemed to me to be a psychological error of the first magnitude. I felt that ... she would, rightly or wrongly, be accused of that very same favouritism. My views made no impression on Miss Carte, but time was to prove that I was right. Discontent grew, changes were constantly taking place, and criticism became rampant. Nor did it stop at the methods of production; it went so far as to suggest a complete lack of knowledge, evidenced ... by constant self-contradiction. There were other accusations levelled against her, of a more serious nature. ... [Those] in control ... apparently assumed in the first place that the performers are little more than automatons and are completely devoid of brains or the ability to think for themselves. Production is done to a plan that takes no consideration of the individual, his personality or his histrionic ability – a stereotyped plan that results in a clockwork performance devoid of spontaneity.

Historian Tony Joseph wrote: "It was the largest single exodus of performers in D'Oyly Carte history, and that was why the sense of sadness that hovered over the season was so marked. ... August 1951 was the end of an era."

=== After D'Oyly Carte ===
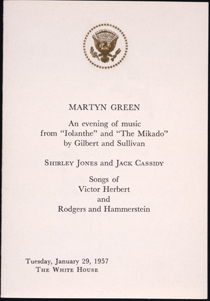
A programme featuring Green at the White House in 1957

After leaving the D'Oyly Carte company, Green appeared as George Grossmith in the film The Story of Gilbert and Sullivan (released in 1953). He then travelled to America, together with Ella Halman and Radley Flynn, to tour in Gilbert and Sullivan operas for S. M. Chartock. He remained in America, settling in New York City, where he continued his career in musicals, plays, television, recordings and films. Apart from his many appearances on Broadway in Gilbert and Sullivan roles up to 1952, his Broadway appearances in the 1950s included Brennan o' the Moor in Red Roses for Me (1955–56), Chang in Shangri-La (1956), Lionel Croy in Child of Fortune (1956), and Kreton in A Visit to a Small Planet, by Gore Vidal (1957–58). In 1954, he appeared with Ginger Rogers in a Producers' Showcase television presentation of Red Peppers from Tonight at 8.30, directed by Otto Preminger. He also played in a number of TV musicals, such as The Stingiest Man in Town as Bob Cratchit (1956).

In 1959, Green's left leg was crushed in a garage elevator and had to be amputated below the knee. An ambulance intern from India, Dr. P. Shamsuddin, borrowed a pocket knife from a police officer to perform the operation without anaesthesia. Green sued the garage company, but the case was dismissed. According to Time, he was operating the elevator himself because he didn't trust the garage attendants to park his MG sports car. Eight months later, using a prosthetic limb, he appeared as W. S. Gilbert in the musical Knights of Song in St. Louis. In 1960 he directed Groucho Marx, Helen Traubel, Stanley Holloway and Robert Rounseville in a Bell Telephone Hour television condensed production of The Mikado. Among Green's regional credits was Kris Kringle in a 1965 Kansas City Starlight Theatre production of Here's Love. He also continued to perform on Broadway, as Colonel Melkett in Black Comedy (1967), Justinus (the innkeeper) and Chaucer in Canterbury Tales (1969), Colonel Sir Francis Chesney in Charley's Aunt (1970), and Col. Elbourne in The Incomparable Max (1971). He also worked in summer stock during the rest of his life.

Green also continued frequently to direct and produce Gilbert and Sullivan productions and worked with various touring companies and in summer stock. His film roles included Finchley in A Lovely Way to Die (1968), and the Captain in The Iceman Cometh (1973). Green last appeared on stage in Chicago (December 1974) in the play The Sea. His final performance in any medium was in The National Radio Theater's 1974 production of Mathry Beacon by Giles Cooper. After this, he returned to his Hollywood, Los Angeles, home (where he had lived since 1973) and was soon hospitalised.

Green died of a blood infection on 8 February 1975, in the Presbyterian Hospital of Hollywood, at the age of 75.

=== Marriages ===
Green was married three times, first to Ethel Beatrice Andrews (born c. 1897) in 1922, and after their divorce to Joyce Mary Fentem (1911–1996) in 1933, with Henry Lytton as best man; this also ended in divorce. Finally, in 1961, he married the operatic soprano Yvonne Chauveau (1922–2016). He had a daughter from the first marriage, Pamela, who married Geoffrey John Farrer Brain (1922–2000) in 1950.

== Recordings and books ==
In addition to his D'Oyly Carte recordings, Green made four additional Gilbert and Sullivan recordings: Martyn Green's Gilbert & Sullivan (Columbia, 1953), The Mikado (Allegro-Royale, 1954), Martyn Green Sings the Gilbert & Sullivan Song Book (MGM, 1962), and The Pirates of Penzance (RCA-Victor, 1966). He appeared on the 1956 soundtrack recording of The Stingiest Man in Town and the 1969 cast album of Canterbury Tales. He did work for radio and television in America including an adaptation of the Major-General's Song for Campbell's Soup. In 1956, Green recorded selections from A Treasury of Ribaldry (edited by Louis Untermeyer, published by Hanover House). He also recorded songs and stories for children, for example, with Julie Andrews (and music by Moondog) in 1957, Songs of Sense & Nonsense – Tell It Again, and a recording called Arabian Nights' Entertainment.

Green wrote two books: an autobiography, Here's a How-de-do in 1952, and an annotated songbook, Martyn Green's Treasury of Gilbert & Sullivan (New York, Simon & Schuster) in 1961. There are two editions of Here's a How-de-do. The American edition (New York, W. W. Norton & Co., 275 pp.) is somewhat more candid and expansive in dealing with D'Oyly Carte personalities and situations than its British counterpart (London, Max Reinhardt, 210 pp). He also wrote an introduction to Leslie Ayre's 1972 The Gilbert & Sullivan Companion, in which he commented wryly that the Gilbert and Sullivan operas "have been translated into many languages, including American and Australian..."

Green's papers are housed at the Howard Gotlieb Archival Research Center in the Mugar Memorial Library at Boston University.

== Filmography ==
- The Mikado (1939) ... Ko-Ko
- The Story of Gilbert and Sullivan (1953) ... George Grossmith
- Suspense: The Adventure of the Black Baronet ... Dr. John H. Watson (Sherlock Holmes's friend) (TV movie, 1953 CBS)
- Studio One: The Gathering Night (1 episode, 1953)
- Kraft Television Theatre (2 TV movies):
  - The Adventures of the Kind Mr. Smith (1953)
  - You Touched Me! (1954)
- The Motorola Television Hour: Black Chiffon ... Robert (TV movie, 1954)
- Producers' Showcase: Tonight at 8.30 ... (segment Red Peppers) (TV movie, 1954)
- The Elgin Hour: Sting of Death ... Mr. Hargrove (TV movie, 1955)
- Hallmark Hall of Fame: Alice in Wonderland ... White Rabbit (TV movie, 1955)
- The Alcoa Hour: The Stingiest Man in Town ... Bob Cratchit (TV movie, 1956)
- The United States Steel Hour: Who's Earnest? ... Chasuble (TV movie, 1957)
- Pinocchio (1957) (TV) ... Fox
- Shirley Temple's Storybook: Dick Whittington and His Cat ... Mr. Fitzwarren (TV movie, 1958)
- True Story ... Harry Kent (1 episode, 15 August 1959)
- The Bell Telephone Hour: The Mikado (1960) ... Director (starring Groucho Marx)
- The Defenders: Die Laughing ... Dr. Fisher (1 episode, 1964)
- The Trials of O'Brien: Notes on a Spanish Prisoner ... Judge Briscoe (1 episode, 1965)
- The Jackie Gleason Show: The Honeymooners: Poor People in Paris ... Major-Domo (1 episode, 1966)
- A Lovely Way to Die (1968) ... Finchley
- The Iceman Cometh (1973) ... Cecil Lewis
- ABC Afterschool Specials: Cyrano (1974) (TV) (voice) ... Comte de Guiche
