= Linda Anne Hutchison =

British singer (born 1945)

Linda Anne Hutchison (born 6 June 1945) is a British singing teacher and vocal health expert, and a retired singer and actress. She is best known for her performances of leading soprano roles in the Gilbert and Sullivan operas with the D'Oyly Carte Opera Company.

Hutchison grew up in Elgin, Scotland, where she developed an early interest in singing and acting. In 1960 she was recruited by the nearby Gordonstoun School, a boys' school, to sing Belinda in a production of Dido and Aeneas and, over the next two years played Yum-Yum in The Mikado and Josephine in H.M.S. Pinafore. She graduated from the Guildhall School of Music & Drama in 1966. She received further training at the Else Mayer-Lismann Operatic Workshop in London, and while there she began to accept freelance engagements, including operatic performances, recitals, tours and festivals.

She joined the D'Oyly Carte Opera Company in 1969 as a chorister, and the next year she was promoted, playing seven of the principal roles in the company's repertoire over the next three years, including at the company's first visit to continental Europe since the 1880s. She left the company in June 1973. Afterwards, she returned to freelance performing, singing roles in opera and oratorio, and giving other concerts and recitals, often together with her husband. In 1981, she began to teach singing in parallel with her performing career, and in 1997 she began to apprentice with a voice clinic for singers and actors. Under a National Health Service contract, she became singing adviser at clinics run by several hospitals. She eventually taught for Guildhall School, the Royal Scottish Academy of Music and Drama, Royal Academy of Music the and the London College of Music & Media and was a guest lecturer at other institutions. She was a director and a president of the British Voice Association and served on the Council of the Association of Teachers of Singing, for which she teaches an annual teacher training course.

Hutchison is co-author of the singing book If in Doubt, Breathe Out! (2016).

== Early years and education ==
Hutchison was born in Perth, Scotland, the youngest of three children of Agnes née Downie (1912–1999) and William Hutchison (1911–1986), both originally of Glasgow. Her father worked for the Aberdeenshire County Council, then for the counties of Nairn and Moray as chief sanitary inspector and master of works. He also volunteered with the Rotary Club. Her mother volunteered for charities, was a member of her church guild and chair of the Inner Wheel (for wives of Rotarians) and the Electrical Association for Women in Scotland. When Hutchison was a small child, the family moved to Elgin in Moray, where she grew up and went to school, including Elgin Academy. Her mother enjoyed poetry and Shakespeare, while her father enjoyed entertaining friends. Her family life was happy, and Hutchison loved music and singing and horse riding. The family enjoyed spending time at the nearby beach at Lossiemouth, visiting Hutchison's grandparents in Paisley, trips to Glasgow and paddle steamer trips on the River Clyde; they also visited England regularly. Hutchison took singing, ballet, piano and elocution lessons. Her musical education took place at the nearby Greyfriars Convent of Mercy, where she sang in the choir from age 7. Her parents took Hutchison to the theatre, when touring companies passed within striking distance, and she expressed an interest in both singing and acting. At the age of 9 or 10, with the Convent, she saw Sadler's Wells Opera perform Die Fledermaus, and Hutchison had an epiphany: people could sing, act and dance for a living. She joined the Moray Ballad Singers, a group led by one of the nuns from the convent.

Recruited in 1960 at the age of 14 by the nearby Gordonstoun School, a boys' school, Hutchison sang her first opera role, Belinda, in a production of Purcell's Dido and Aeneas; in the next two years at the school, she played Yum-Yum in The Mikado and then Josephine in H.M.S. Pinafore. Later in 1962, Hutchison enrolled at Guildhall School of Music & Drama in London; there she received the Sydney de Vries Opera Prize. She studied music, drama (especially opera) and dance, graduating in 1966. While at the college, she also performed in many concerts and some plays, including Separate Tables. She also had the opportunity, in 1965, to meet Prince Philip at a garden party at Holyrood Palace in Edinburgh, where she chatted to him about Flanders and Swann. From 1966 to 1969, Hutchison trained further at the Else Mayer-Lismann Operatic Workshop in London, supported partly by the Sir James Caird Memorial Award scholarship. While she was there, she began to accept freelance engagements, including operatic performances, recitals, tours and festivals, both in Germany and England; she played Albena in Rossini's La donna del lago at the Camden Festival in 1969.

== D'Oyly Carte years ==
After hearing her in the finals of the Kathleen Ferrier Scholarship Competition in 1969, Frederic Lloyd, the General Manager of the D'Oyly Carte Opera Company, offered Hutchison an audition. She joined the company as a chorister in September 1969, performing in all ten operas then in its repertory. The company toured around Britain for most of the year. Around the Christmas-New Year's season, the company played for three months at Sadler's Wells Theatre in London. Later during her first season she was given the chance to play the role of Phyllis in a performance of Iolanthe. Hutchison was promoted as one of the company's two principal sopranos and, in September 1970, she began her second season playing six roles in the Gilbert and Sullivan canon: the Plaintiff in Trial by Jury, Josephine in H.M.S. Pinafore, Patience in Patience, Phyllis in Iolanthe, Elsie in The Yeomen of the Guard, and Gianetta in The Gondoliers. She received generally good reviews praising her "strong voice, excellent breath control and surety of line", as well as her appearance, "captivating sparkle". Early in the season, the company visited Denmark – it was the first time since the 1880s that it has performed anywhere in continental Europe. Then it played another long holiday run at Sadler's Wells. Later that season, when the company introduced a new production of The Sorcerer after they had not performed the opera since 1939, Hutchison recreated the role of Constance. A review in the Financial Times said "The best singer [of the evening] was Linda Anne Hutchison".

Hutchison's second season with D'Oyly Carte ended with a month of performances at the Royal Festival Hall in London. One the first day of that run, 28 July 1971, in London, Hutchison married Henry Gordon Stewart (born 1934), a professor at the Royal College of Music. He sang and played piano. Coincidentally, at the 1964 production of The Yeomen of the Guard at the Tower of London, he had been the rehearsal pianist. The couple had met in 1969, shortly before she joined the company, at the Else Mayer-Lismann Operatic Workshop, where both were students. Later Stewart became a producer and presenter for the BBC, especially BBC Radio 3. As Hutchison began her third season with D'Oyly Carte in September 1971, the young couple discovered the difficulties of living apart from each other while Hutchison was on tour away from their new home in London for most of the year. They were grateful for their time together during the company's holiday run at Sadler's Wells. On the last night of its London runs, the company traditionally gave a camp, irreverent performance; in this one, Hutchison performed as Phyllis wearing a tartan plaid and using a heavy Scottish accent. Towards the end of the season, she and Stewart bought a home in Sidcup, southeast London.

Finding it difficult to play two principal roles in the company's double bill of Trial and Pinafore, Hutchison requested that the role of the Plaintiff be assigned to someone else, and the company accommodated that request in October 1972. By this point in her tenure, she had accumulated an enthusiastic fan following. After the long London run at Sadler's Wells, in March 1973, she participated in press events to publicize the company's upcoming Manchester run. She left the D'Oyly Carte Opera Company in June 1973.

== Later years ==
Hutchison soon returned to freelance performing. Her operatic roles were Donizetti's Adina in L'elisir d'amore and Norina in Don Pasquale, Puccini's Mimi in La bohème and Magda in La rondine, Violetta in Verdi's La traviata, Marguerite in Gounod's Faust, Nedda in Leoncavallo's Pagliacci, and Mozart's Countess in The Marriage of Figaro and Fiordiligi in Così fan tutte. Her concert work included Mendelssohn's Lobgesang and Hear my prayer, Rossini's Stabat Mater and religious songs by Peter Cornelius. She also frequently sang recitals, either alone or with her husband; sometimes Stewart accompanied her solo recitals on the piano, and sometimes he both sang with her (he is a tenor) and accompanied. She sometimes incorporated Gilbert and Sullivan numbers into her concerts and recitals. Hutchison and Stewart had their only child, a son, Angus, in 1976. At one of the baby's medical checkups, she met and befriended a musician who thereafter often accompanied her duets with Stewart on the piano and played flute in their soprano, flute and piano trio; Stewart arranged some of their recital music.

In 1981, a young woman who had heard Hutchison sing asked if she would give her singing lessons. She responded that she did not teach, but the woman was persistent, and eventually Hutchison agreed. She found that she enjoyed teaching and began to take on further students, while continuing to perform. She also began to study more of the technical and anatomical aspects of singing. In 1997 she observed a team consultation session at the multidisciplinary voice clinic for singers and actors at Queen Mary's Hospital in Sidcup. This included a laryngologist, a speech therapist, a vocal health specialist, a singing teacher and a clinical osteopath. She volunteered, over the next five years, as an apprentice with the clinic and developed expertise as a therapist for performers with vocal problems. After this, under a National Health Service contract, she became singing adviser at clinics run by Medway Maritime Hospital in Gillingham and then St Bartholomew's Hospital, London. The Sidcup clinic was then shut down and restarted in Lewisham, where she became the vocal rehabilitation coach. She also had her own private voice rehabilitation practice, while continuing to teach voice privately.

She eventually joined the staff of the Guildhall School's vocal and singing departments. Hutchison later taught the musical theatre course for postgraduates at the Royal Academy of Music and at the Royal Scottish Academy of Music and Drama (later named the Royal Conservatoire of Scotland) was a visiting staff member for several years. She has also been a visiting lecturer at the University of London's Birkbeck College and at the Irish College of Music Theatre was a guest tutor. She was a director of the voice department at the London College of Music & Media. For the British Voice Association (BVA), she served as a director of from 2005 to 2008 and as president in 2007–2008; around this time she retired from performing professionally. Hutchison taught "The Fundamentals of the Singing Voice", a professional development course run jointly by the BVA and the City Literary Institute, which considered the relationship between artistic freedom and the science of the singing voice. She teaches an annual teacher training course for the Council of the Association of Teachers of Singing, on whose council she served, that covers accent breathing, anatomy of the voice and music theatre. She gives various presentations and runs performance workshops on these topics. Hutchison is a vice president of the Gilbert and Sullivan Society in London, where she has given and participated in several concerts. She has continued to perform there in 2025.

Hutchison is co-author of a book on breath support for singing, If in Doubt, Breathe Out! (2016).

== Sources ==
- Ayre, Leslie (1972). The Gilbert & Sullivan Companion. London: W. H. Allen & Co. ISBN 0-19-516700-7.
- Bradley, Ian (2005). Oh Joy! Oh Rapture! The Enduring Phenomenon of Gilbert and Sullivan. Oxford University Press. ISBN 0-330-24138-9.
- Joseph, Tony (2010). Linda Anne Hutchison: Enchantment, Surely. Bristol: Bunthorne Books. ISBN 978-0-9566335-0-7.
