= Fred Clifton =

English opera singer and actor

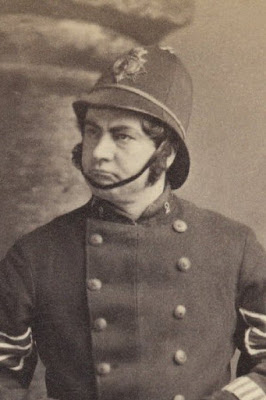
Fred Clifton as the Sergeant of Police

Thomas Husler Greene (29 May 1844 – 7 September 1903), who performed as Fred Clifton, was an English opera singer and actor known for creating three roles in the early Gilbert and Sullivan comic operas: the Notary in The Sorcerer (1877), the Boatswain in H.M.S. Pinafore (1878) and the Sergeant of Police in The Pirates of Penzance (1879).

== Early life and career ==
Clifton was born in Dudley, Worcestershire (now West Midlands), the oldest of four children of Frederick Greene, a hairdresser and later a music seller, and his wife Eliza (nee Husler).

Clifton began his career in Reading in 1861 at the Theatre Royal and performed in provincial concerts thereafter. In 1862, in Liverpool, he married Ellen Matilda Hird (born c. 1848), of Shaldon, Devon, who sometimes used the stage name Therese Brunelli. The two began to perform as Mr and Mrs Fred Clifton in music halls and other venues with their own act as "burlesque operatic, high and low comic, duettists and solo comic and sentimental singers" near Hull and Sculcoates around where her family then lived. In 1865, Clifton was performing in London as a musical lecturer and entertainer at the Royal Polytechnic Institute, and, later, at The Crystal Palace. In 1868 he played Krakwitz in Offenbach's The Last of the Paladins, and subsequently appeared at various other London theatres. In 1872, Richard D'Oyly Carte was representing Brunelli as her theatrical agent when she was engaged in the title role of the first English production of The Black Crook in London's Alhambra Theatre in 1872. By that time, Clifton was touring with the Eldred opéra-bouffe company, among others. By 1877, the couple had separated, although Clifton's wife continued to perform as Mrs Clifton for several years.

== D'Oyly Carte years ==
In November 1877 Clifton originated the small part of The Notary in the original production of Gilbert and Sullivan's The Sorcerer at the Opera Comique, produced by Carte. He also played the role of the Grand Duke in The Spectre Knight, and then the Usher in Trial by Jury, one-act operas that played as companion pieces with The Sorcerer. In May 1878, at the Opera Comique, he created the role of Bill Bobstay, the Boatswain, in the company's long-running international hit, H.M.S. Pinafore, and also continued to appear in the companion pieces.

In November 1879, Clifton travelled to New York City with Gilbert, Sullivan and Carte. There, in December, he played Bobstay in the first authorized production of Pinafore at the Fifth Avenue Theatre. He then created the role of the Sergeant of Police at the same theatre, beginning on December 31, 1879, in the original production of The Pirates of Penzance and later on tour with Carte's First American Company until June 1880. Later that month, Clifton sailed back to England on SS Abyssinia with other members of the company.

== Later years ==
Clifton was appearing in Brighton, England, by the second half of July 1880. In 1881, he played the Registrar General in La Belle Normande, an adaptation of Léon Vasseur's 1874 operetta La famille Trouillat ou La rosière d'Honfleur, at the Globe Theatre, Newcastle Street.

Clifton apparently returned to the US by the middle of the decade, as an actor of that name played the butler in Twins at the Standard Theatre in New York in May 1885. He appeared with Lillian Russell and fellow ex-D'Oyly Carte principals J. H. Ryley and Alice Barnett in Billee Taylor at New York's Casino Theatre in July 1885 and with Harry Paulton and company in the comic opera Paola by Edward Jakobowski, with a libretto by Paulton and Tedde at the Grand Opera House, Philadelphia, in 1889. Clifton continued to appear in comic opera in New York until 1897. He also composed incidental music for plays.

After leaving his wife in 1877, Clifton lived with a chorine called Mary or Marie Glover. They soon had a daughter in England, and she moved with Clifton to America; they eventually had six more children.

Clifton died in Boston, Massachusetts in 1903 at the age of 59.

== Sources ==
- Ayre, Leslie (1972). The Gilbert & Sullivan Companion. London: W.H. Allen & Co Ltd. ISBN 0-396-06634-8.
