= Libiamo ne' lieti calici =

Duet from the opera La traviata by Giuseppe Verdi

"Libiamo ne' lieti calici" (3:06)

"Libiamo ne' lieti calici" (Italian pronunciation: [liˈbjaːmo ne ˈljɛːti ˈkaːlitʃi]; "Let's drink from the joyful cups") is a famous duet with chorus from Giuseppe Verdi's La traviata (1853), one of the best-known opera melodies and a popular performance choice (as is this opera itself) for many great tenors and sopranos. The song is a brindisi, a lively song that encourages the drinking of wine or other alcoholic beverages.

== Scene ==
The duet is performed in the first act of the opera, during a late-night party at Violetta Valéry's house. It is sung by Violetta and Alfredo Germont, a young man who is in love with her. Alfredo is convinced by his friend Gastone and by Violetta to show off his voice. He begins this drinking song, later joined by Violetta and the rest of the company.

The piece is written in B-flat major, its time signature is 3/8, and the tempo is marked Allegretto, . = 69.

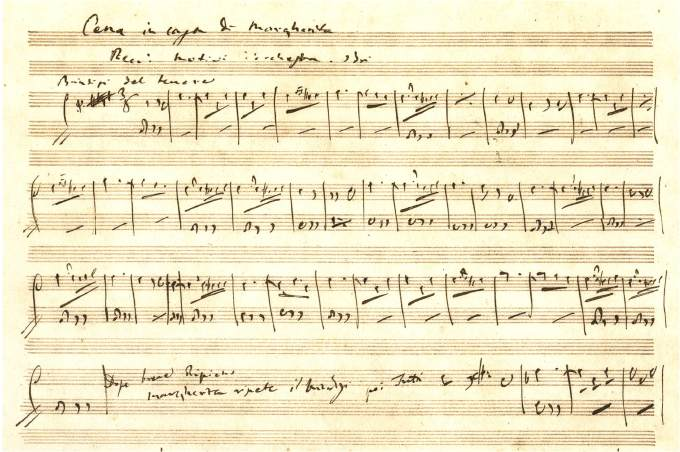
Autograph manuscript of a sketch for "Brindisi"

== Libretto ==
Francesco Maria Piave wrote the text.

Alfredo
Libiamo, libiamo ne' lieti calici
che la bellezza infiora;
e la fuggevol, fuggevol ora
s'inebrii a voluttà.
Libiam ne' dolci fremiti
che suscita l'amore,
poiché quell'occhio al core onnipotente va.
Libiamo, amore, amor fra i calici
più caldi baci avrà.

Flora, Gastone, Barone, Dottore, Marchese, coro:
Ah, libiam, amor fra' calici
più caldi baci avrà.

Violetta
Tra voi, tra voi saprò dividere
il tempo mio giocondo;
tutto è follia, follia nel mondo
ciò che non è piacer.
Godiam, fugace e rapido
è il gaudio dell'amore;
è un fior che nasce e muore,
ne più si può goder.
Godiam, c'invita, c'invita un fervido
accento lusinghier.

Flora, Gastone, Barone, Dottore, Marchese, coro:
Ah, godiamo, la tazza, la tazza e il cantico,
La notte abbella e il riso;
in questo, in questo paradiso ne scopra il nuovo dì.

Violetta: La vita è nel tripudio.
Alfredo: Quando non s'ami ancora.
Violetta: Nol dite a chi l'ignora.
Alfredo: È il mio destin così.

Tutti
Ah, godiamo, la tazza, la tazza e il cantico,
La notte abbella e il riso;
in questo, in questo paradiso ne scopra il nuovo dì.
Ah, ah, ne scopra il dì. (Ne sco, il no, il novo dì.)
Ah, ah, ne scopra il dì. (Ne sco, il no, il novo dì.)
Ah, sì... (Sì, ne scopra, ne scopra il nuovo dì...)

Translation:

Alfredo
Let's drink, let's drink from the joyous chalices
that beauty decorates with flowers.
And may the fleeting moment
be elated with voluptuousness.
Let's drink from the sweet thrills
that love arouses,
because that eye aims straight to the almighty heart.
Let's drink, my love: the love among chalices
will have warmer kisses.

Flora, Gastone, Barone, Dottore, Marchese, Chorus
Ah, let's drink, my love: the love among chalices
will have warmer kisses.

Violetta
With you, with you I'll be able to share
my cheerful times.
Everything is foolish in the world
which is not pleasure.
Let's enjoy ourselves, for fleeting and quick
the delight of love is:
it's a flower that blooms and dies
and can no longer be enjoyed.
Let's enjoy ourselves, fervent
flattering voice invites us.

Flora, Gastone, Barone, Dottore, Marchese, Chorus
Ah, let's enjoy the cup, the cup and the chants,
the embellished nights and the laughter;
let the new day find us in this paradise.

Violetta: Life means celebration.
Alfredo: If one hasn't known love.
Violetta: Don't tell someone who doesn't know.
Alfredo: But this is my fate.

All
Ah, let's enjoy the cup, the cup and the chants,
the embellished night and the laughter;
let the new day find us in this paradise.
Ah, ah, let the new day find us. (We shall let the new day find us.)
Ah, ah, let the new day find us. (We shall let the new day find us.)
Ah, yes... (Yes, we shall let, we shall let the new day find us...)
