= Nuts and Wine =

Musical

Nuts and Wine was a theatrical revue, with lyrics by C. H. Bovill and P. G. Wodehouse and music by Frank E. Tours, with additional numbers by Guy Jones and Melville Gideon, from a book by Bovill and Wodehouse. It was performed at the Empire Theatre, London, opening on 3 January 1914. The show closed on 28 March 1914, after a run of 12 weeks.

== Plot synopsis ==
The revue did not have a coherent plot, its six scenes being linked only by a surreal vision of an England changed beyond recognition and by the appearance in each scene of the character of Mr Punch, as compère:

Scene 1 – New Eton

Scene 2 — New News

Scene 3 – New Mayflower

Scene 4 – New Ellis Island

Scene 5 – New Little Theatre

Scene 6 – New Empire Stores

Two other scenes—the New Clown and the New Idol—seem to have been dropped before the show opened.

Each scene provided a setting for a series of songs and dances, mostly satirising topics of the day, with frequent references to well-known personalities or topical events.

In the first scene, the playing fields of Eton have been turned into a market garden, and the school curriculum has been reduced to just three subjects, music hall, tango (taught by music-hall star Gertie Millar), and agriculture.

The second scene is set in the offices of the New News, a newspaper that has absorbed The Times and whose editor—one George L. Washington of Pittsburg, grandson of the famous president—prints the news first, then makes it happen. The newspaper's gossip columnist is Lady Teazle, actually one of the characters in Sheridan's The School for Scandal. This scene included a lengthy song poking fun at David Lloyd George, the then Chancellor of the Exchequer.

Scene 3 takes place on the New Mayflower, a yacht which is carrying passengers to New Ellis Island. Though the yacht catches fire and sinks, the next scene is still set in New Ellis Island, a newly discovered country to which Britain has taken to banishing its bores and other inconvenient inhabitants.

The fifth scene is set in a music hall, the New Little Theatre, and features a play within a play supposedly written by the Vicar of Brixton, who watches from a box in the company of Mr Punch, while world boxing champion Jack Johnson shares another box with Rev F B Meyer. The real vicar of Brixton, the Rev A J Waldron, had recently authored a "semi-morality play"., and Johnson, to the annoyance of many music-hall artistes, had been engaged to appear at a number of music halls. The play-with-a-play is performed by caricatures of well-known theatrical entertainers, including George Graves, Edmund Payne, Wilkie Bard, and Mrs Patrick Campbell.

The final scene is set in the New Empire Stores and is a parody of Within the Law, a play (adapted from that of Bayard Veiller) which was then being performed at the Haymarket Theatre. and which featured a department store, the Emporium. The scene also included a sketch parodying another popular play, the French farce Who's the Lady, by Jose Levy, which had opened at the Garrick Theatre in November 1913.

== Performers ==
Among those appearing in the revue, the following were specifically mentioned in the reviews or advertisements:

- Phyllis Bedells
- R. G. Knowles
- Maidie Hope
- Fred Payne
- Nelson Keys
- Lauri Hunter
- Violet Lloyd
- Peggy Ross
- Dahlia Gordon
- Rose Hamilton
- Babette
- Albert Le Fre
- Julian Alfred
- Eric Thorne
- James Godden
- Dorothy Monkman

== Critical reception ==
The revue had a mixed reception. The Daily Express noted that "half a dozen scintillating items ... in these days of much dulness is probably not a bad achievement", but remarked of the script by Bovill and Wodehouse that "it does little credit to their ingenuity". The Express reserved most praise for the dancing of Phyllis Bedells, who was "thunderously cheered" for what it described as "the one purely and delightfully artistic contribution of the whole entertainment".

The Times referred to "a number of clever artists for the most part making good fun out of material that was not very funny" and commented that "for lack of wit in the treatment, some of the best things miss fire", while the London correspondent of the Sydney Morning Herald, in paragraph on the continuing craze for revues in England, dismissed it as "not a very brilliant specimen".

The Express described the first scene as "one of the best" and referred to "the final brilliance of the New Empire Stores", but considered the marionette show in the fifth scene to be "very clever, but over-long". In sharp contrast, The Observer concluded: "Perhaps the most successful of all the scenes is the play at the New Little Theatre." But the Observer's final summing-up matched that of the other reviews: "For the rest, there did not seem to us to be quite as much novelty about the revue as the titles of the scenes suggested."

Despite their reservations, most of the reviews noted that the show was "very heartily applauded at the close", which may explain why it was performed nightly for 12 weeks; and it seems that the run came to an end not because the show was unsuccessful but because the management of the Empire Theatre changed during March 1914 and the new management—Alfred Butt and Charles B. Cochran—wanted a change.

== Origin of the name ==
"Nuts and wine" is a reference to the British tradition of serving walnuts with the port that was passed around at the end of a dinner.
