= Brindisi (music) =

Song to drink alcohol to

A brindisi (pronounced [ˈbrindizi]; Italian for "toast") is a song in which a company is exhorted to drink, a drinking song.

The word is Italian, but it derives from an old German phrase, (ich) bringe dir's – "(I) offer it to you", which at one time was used to introduce a toast. The transformation of that phrase into the current Italian word may have been influenced by similar-sounding name of the Italian city of Brindisi, but otherwise the city and the term are etymologically unrelated.

The term brindisi is often used in opera. Typically, in an operatic brindisi, one character introduces a toast with a solo melody and the full ensemble later joins in the refrain.

Some well-known operatic numbers labeled brindisi are:

- "Cantiamo, facciam brindisi", chorus in Gaetano Donizetti's L'Elisir d'Amore (1832)
- "Il segreto per esser felici", sung by Orsini in act 2 of Donizetti's Lucrezia Borgia (1833)
- "Si colmi il calice", sung by Lady Macbeth in act 2 of Verdi's Macbeth (1847/1865)
- "Libiamo ne' lieti calici", sung by Alfredo and Violetta in act 1 of Verdi's La traviata (1853)
- "Ô vin, dissipe la tristesse" sung by Hamlet in act 2 of Thomas's Hamlet (1868)
- "The Tea-Cup Brindisi", in the finale of act 1 of Gilbert and Sullivan's The Sorcerer (1877)
- "Inaffia l'ugola!", sung by Iago in act 1 of Verdi's Otello (1887)
- "Viva, il vino spumeggiante", sung by Turiddu in scene 2 of Mascagni's Cavalleria rusticana (1890)
