= Henry Howard Paul =

Howard Paul and Mrs Howard Paul in the 1860s

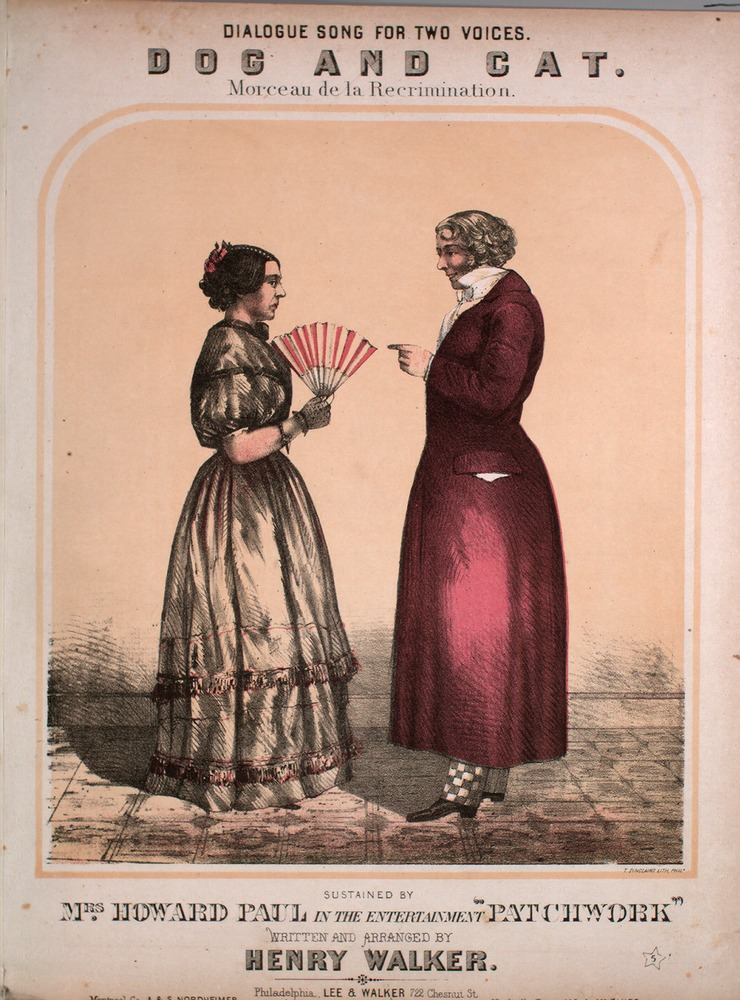
Mr and Mrs Howard Paul on a sheet music cover from Patchwork

George Henry Howard Paul (18 November 1830 – 9 December 1905), known on stage as Howard Paul, was an American writer, playwright, comic actor and theatrical manager who made his name and spent most of his career in the United Kingdom. In 1854 he married the British singer and actress Isabella Hill, and the two appeared together in Britain and the United States as Mr and Mrs Howard Paul for more than two decades, in comic pieces written by Paul. The couple separated around 1877, after he began an affair with the actress Letty Lind. After that affair ended, Paul continued to write through the 1880s and acted as a theatre manager in Britain.

== Early life and career ==
Born in Philadelphia in 1830, the son of Stephen Carmick Paul, a General Manager, in 1850 Howard Paul went to London to work as a journalist; while there he wrote the serial Dashes of American Humor, or Yankee Stories (1853) with pictures by John Leech, who had illustrated several novels by Charles Dickens. He made his debut as a comic writer in London with his play Diogenes (1852). In 1854 he married Isabella Hill, who from then on acted under the name Mrs Howard Paul. In the same year he made his debut as an actor in Bath, Somerset, England in 1854 in his vaudeville piece My Neighbor Opposite in which his wife appeared, also acting with her in his comic duologue, Locked Out, which proved to be very popular and toured extensively in the provinces.

In 1858 the couple also appeared in Paul's Patchwork, described as "a clatter of fun, frolic, song, and impersonation." They revived this for some years. Another piece that they toured was called Thrice Married. He returned to the U.S. in 1866–67 and 1869 to tour there with his wife.

== Letty Lind and later years ==
A protégée was the actress and dancer Letty Lind who toured with the Pauls from about the age of ten. The Pauls billed her as "La Petite Letitia". Howard Paul became Lind's lover and fathered two illegitimate children by her: a girl who died in infancy (1878) and a son (Henry Horace Howard Paul Rudge (1880–1969), a tobacco merchant). Mrs Paul left her husband about 1877, in view of the affair, but continued to perform under the name Mrs Howard Paul; she died in 1879. In 1881, Lind left Paul's company. It is not clear exactly when their relationship ended, but Paul married Florence Kate Arthur (1867–1941) in London in 1889. On the required documentation he described himself as "a widower".

In his later years Paul rarely appeared in public, acting by now as a theatre manager in Britain and returning to journalism and writing. Besides the works mentioned above, he also wrote the books The Young Chemist or Pastimes for Youth (London, 1851); The Book of American Songs, with Notes, Biographical and Critical (1857); Patchwork Embroidered with Art, Whim, and Fancy (1859); Howard Paul's Funny Stories (1882); Clever Things said by Children (1886), and Funny Stories that will make You Laugh out Loud (1888).

He died in Bournemouth in December 1905, leaving £55,905 8s 2d in his will.
