= Mrs Howard Paul =

British actress, singer and manager

Mrs Howard Paul in the 1870s

Isabella Hill (1 April 1833 – 6 June 1879), better known as Mrs Howard Paul, was an English actress, operatic singer and actress-manager of the Victorian era, best remembered for creating the role of Lady Sangazure in the Gilbert and Sullivan comic opera The Sorcerer (1877).

Her stage career began in 1853 in London in ballad operas, such as The Beggar's Opera. In 1854 she married the American writer Henry Howard Paul, in whose comic entertainments the two performed for much of the next two decades, often on tour, both in Britain and America. She was popular for her musical impersonations of singers of the day. She also played in Victorian burlesque and other theatrical roles, among the best known of which was her Lady Macbeth at the Theatre Royal, Drury Lane in 1869. Various composers wrote songs for her to premiere.

After The Sorcerer, Gilbert and Sullivan cast Mrs Paul in their next opera, H.M.S. Pinafore, but her vocal abilities had declined so much by that point that they cut parts of her role, and she resigned from the production.

== Early life and career ==
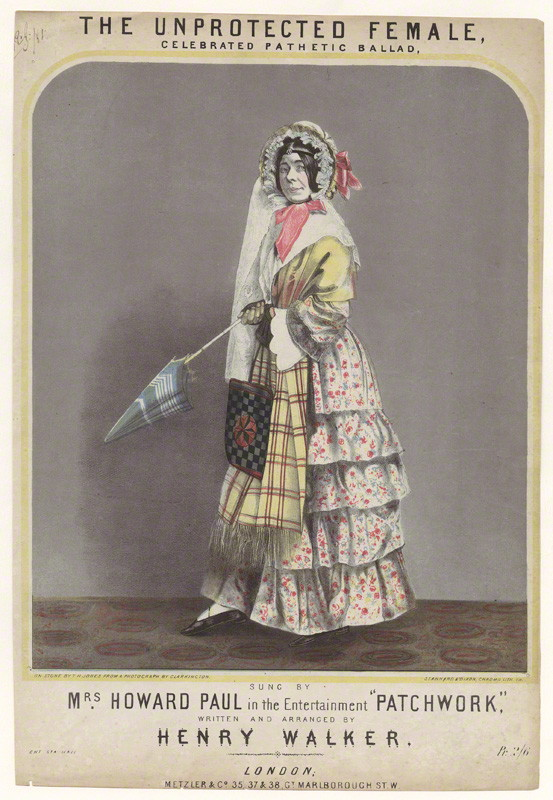
Mrs Howard Paul on a sheet music cover from Patchwork (1858)

Mrs Howard Paul was born as Isabella Hill at Dartford in Kent, the daughter of George Thomas Hill, a leather merchant. She was educated in France and Italy, and studied singing under the composer and teacher George French Flowers, whose biographer Louisa Middleton rates her as "perhaps his most distinguished" pupil.

Under the name Isabella Featherstone she began her stage career as a member of the Strand Theatre company in London. There, in January 1853, she played Tom Tug in Charles Dibdin's ballad opera The Waterman. According to the theatrical newspaper The Era, she made a great hit. She appeared briefly at the Theatre Royal, Cork the following month, returning to the Strand in March to play Captain Macheath en travesti in The Beggar's Opera. In April she was cast as Margery in Thomas Arne's Love in a Village at the Strand. The Era commented, "We take the opportunity of predicting for her much future success. She has an excellent voice and is by no means devoid of acting capabilities." After this, she played Lucy Lockit in The Beggar's Opera.

The Era later reported, "Her dashing style and rich, powerful voice at once attracted attention and more important engagements rapidly followed at Drury Lane and the Haymarket." They included Drury Lane's Christmas pantomime in December 1853, and, the following month, Mark Lemon's Paula Lazarro, in which she played Juana. At the Haymarket, she again played Macheath from April 1854. In July of that year she married the American writer and actor Henry Howard Paul at St Paul's, Covent Garden in London. Shortly after the wedding the couple went to Switzerland, in August 1854, and performed with success in Geneva. They went on to Paris, where she played for a month at the Théâtre du Palais-Royal in a specially-written sketch, La fille adroit, which was highly praised by Jules Janin in the Journal des débats.

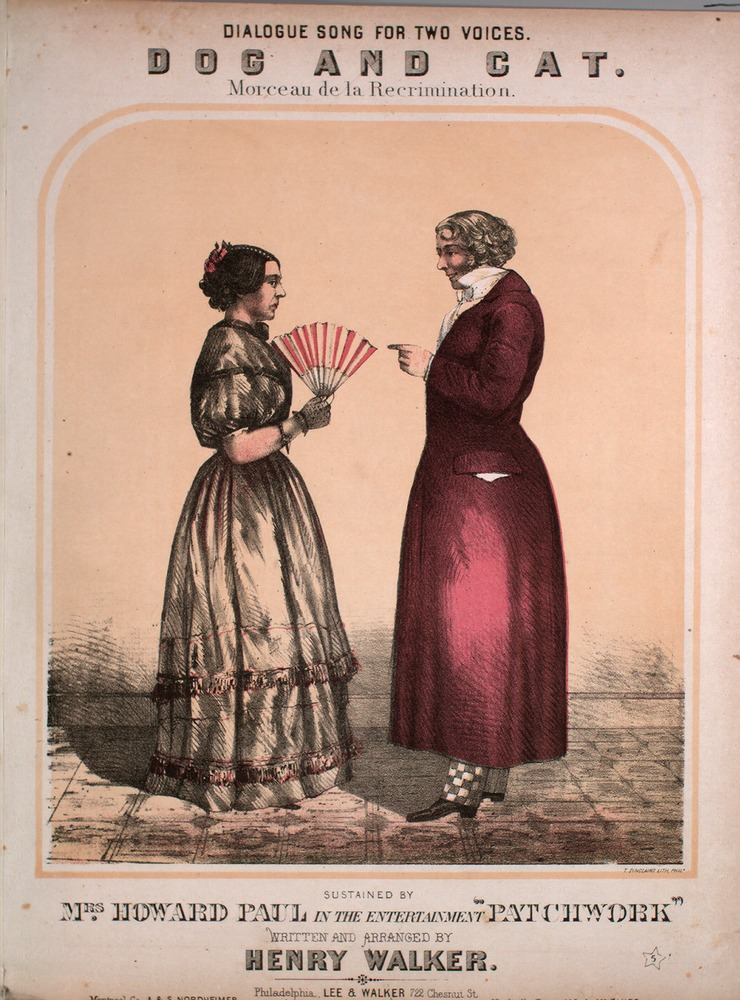
Mr and Mrs Howard Paul on another sheet music cover from Patchwork

Later the same year she acted in her husband's play My Neighbor Opposite and a comic duologue, Locked Out, which proved to be very popular and toured extensively in the provinces. In September 1855 she was engaged at Wallack's Theatre in New York City. Over the ensuing years, at the Haymarket and elsewhere, she became known not only for her Macheath, but also as Apollo in the burlesque of Midas by Kane O'Hara, among other roles. In 1858 she took part with her husband in an entertainment called Patchwork, described as "a clatter of fun, frolic, song, and impersonation carried on by performers of unfailing dash"; they performed this popular piece in London and elsewhere for some years. In July of the same year she was Sir Launcelot de Lake (sic) in the Lancashire Witches, or the Knight and the Giants, a burlesque included as part of an entertainment that opened the Lyceum Theatre.

In musical entertainments given by herself and her husband in 1860 and over the next 17 years in London and the provinces, Mrs Paul became a favourite for her impersonations of Henry Russell, Sims Reeves, and other popular singers of the day, particularly tenors. Another piece that they toured was called Thrice Married. Mrs Howard Paul's voice was admired by various composers, who wrote songs for her to premiere.

== Later years ==
Early in 1867 she returned with her husband for engagements in the United States. In September of that year, she was back in London at the Strand Theatre playing Mrs Dove in her husband's Ripples on the Lake. At the Olympic Theatre in 1868 she appeared in the title role of The Grand Duchess of Gerolstein; this production also went on tour in Britain. She repeated the role in a French version of this in Paris.

At the Drury Lane Theatre in 1869, she played Lady Macbeth opposite Samuel Phelps and Charles Dillon on alternate nights. "Anticipating subsequent actresses, she softened Lady Macbeth, subjugating to conjugal love the sterner traits ordinarily assigned the character." On the same evenings, she doubled in the role of Hecate in Macbeth. She then toured the provinces with a company of her own, playing a series of drawing-room entertainments. Among the characters that she portrayed through song were the bluestocking Miss Grym, the advocate of women's rights, and Jemimer Cobb ("cruelly deceived by the Footman who wore false whiskers"). In February 1870, she was playing Drogan in Genevieve de Brabant in New York. She played the title role in H. B. Farnie's burlesque Little Gil Blas at the Princess's Theatre, London from December 1870.

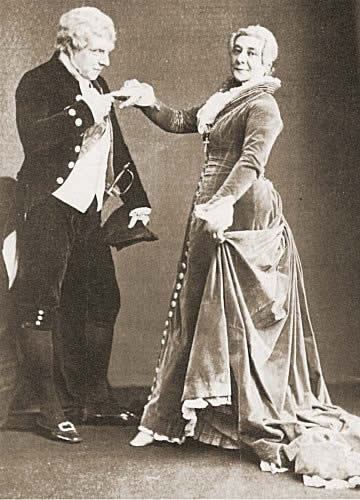
Richard Temple with Mrs Howard Paul in The Sorcerer (1877)

In 1871 she and her husband were living in Liverpool when not on tour; both their occupations were listed as "Musical Artiste" in the census. She was Mistigris in Babil and Bijou by Dion Boucicault at the Royal Opera House in Covent Garden (1872–73), with music by Hervé and Frederick Clay.

In 1877 the impresario Richard D'Oyly Carte approached Mrs Paul to play the part of Lady Sangazure in the new Gilbert and Sullivan opera The Sorcerer, which Carte was producing at the Opera Comique. She accepted on condition that her 24-year-old protégé, Rutland Barrington, was given a part, and he was cast in the role of Dr Daly, the vicar.

Her appearance in The Sorcerer proved to be her last London engagement; by this stage in her career her voice was deteriorating. She was engaged to play Cousin Hebe in the next Gilbert and Sullivan production, H.M.S. Pinafore (for which she was to be paid 10 guineas a week "to sing and act as principal contralto during the period of the run"). Gilbert made an effort to write an amusing part for her despite Sullivan's reluctance to use her, but her declining abilities were apparent, and cuts were made to her part. By mid-May 1878, both Gilbert and Sullivan wanted her out of the cast; unhappy with the cuts, Mrs Paul left the production. With only a week to go before opening night, Carte engaged the concert singer Jessie Bond to play the now much smaller role of Cousin Hebe.

Meanwhile, Mrs Howard Paul had left her husband in around 1877, as he was having an affair with the actress-dancer Letty Lind, by whom he fathered two illegitimate children. His wife continued performing under her married name. Her last performance was in May 1879 in Sheffield as Mrs Denham in James Albery's comedy The Crisis. On 1 June, a critic in The Era wrote, "We have rarely seen better acting … Mrs Howard Paul as Mrs Denham alone repays a visit". By the time the notice appeared she had been taken gravely ill. She was brought to her home in London near Bedford Park, Turnham Green, and on 6 June 1879 she died there. She was buried at Brompton Cemetery in West London.

== Reputation ==
Mrs Paul's obituary in The New York Times said: "She was gifted with a wonderful voice [but] ... nearly all her efforts were made in the lighter branches of dramatic and musical art ... her acting was at once droll and vivacious". Henry Barton Baker, in his History of the London Stage and Its Famous Players, called her "A charming actress and a beautiful singer". Opinions differed on whether she had made the best use of her talents. Joseph Knight wrote in the Dictionary of National Biography: "Mrs Howard Paul was a woman of ability, whose talents were often frittered away in parts and occupations unworthy of them." A writer in The Athenaeum agreed, commenting that "had she adhered to the lyric stage instead of being an erratic artist associated with Mr Howard Paul in 'musical and dramatic entertainments,' [she] would have taken the highest position as a contralto." Another contemporary critic considered that she had in fact achieved a high position:

Never could the motto "A host in themselves" be more appropriately applied to any party than to this one. Not a hundred Christy minstrels, not the funniest comic singers, not the most comical clowns at Christmas pantomimes could raise such hearty and spontaneous laughter as was evoked last evening by Mrs Howard Paul and Mr Walter Pelham. The lady, who ranks in one of the highest branches in her profession, is wonderfully clever, both in dramatic versatility and vocal ability."
