= Alphamstone =

Village in Essex, England

Coordinates: 51°59′20″N 0°44′34″E

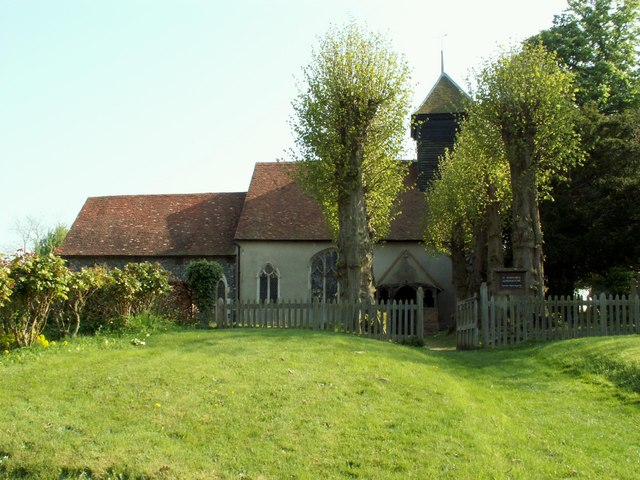
- St Barnabas's Church, Alphamstone

- Location within Essex
- Area: 2.67 sq mi (6.9 km^{2})
- Population: 225 (Parish, 2021)
  - Density: 84/sq mi (32/km^{2})
- OS grid reference: TL884358
- Civil parish: Alphamstone
- District: Braintree
- Shire county: Essex
- Region: East
- Country: England
- Sovereign state: United Kingdom
- Post town: BURES
- Postcode district: CO8
- Dialling code: 01787
- Police: Essex
- Fire: Essex
- Ambulance: East of England
- UK Parliament: Braintree

Alphamstone is a village and civil parish in Essex, England. It is located 3 3/4 miles (6.0 km) south of Sudbury in Suffolk and is 20 mi (32 km) northeast from the county town of Chelmsford. The village is a mile west of the River Stour, which forms the Essex-Suffolk county-border in the local area. In 1831 the population of the village was 244 inhabitants. At the 2021 census the parish had a population of 225.

The village is in the district of Braintree and in the parliamentary constituency of Braintree. The parish is part of the Stour Valley South parish cluster.

The parish is 1,709 acres (2.67 sq mi; 692 ha) with a geology of fertile clay-soils, and is at an elevation of 216 feet (66 m) above sea level.

It is about 2 miles (3.2 km) from the nearest railway station at Bures on the Sudbury Branch Line. Its nearest significant road link is the A131.

The village has one parish church, the C of E St Barnabas. It was built in the thirteenth century and went through restorations in the 16th and 19th centuries. The churchyard also features seven sarsen stones, potentially once a prehistoric stone circle.
