= What Every Woman Knows =

What Every Woman Knows may refer to:

- What Every Woman Knows (play), a 1908 four-act play written by J. M. Barrie
- What Every Woman Knows (1921 film), a silent comedy-drama film adapted from the play
- What Every Woman Knows (1917 film), a British comedy drama
- What Every Woman Knows (1934 film), an American romantic comedy
