= Bedbrook =

Bedbrook is a surname. Notable people with the surname include:

- Edith Waldemar Leverton (née Bedbrook; 1868–1955), English writer and editor
- George Bedbrook (1921–1991), Australian medical doctor and surgeon
- James Albert Bedbrook (1845–1902), English naval engineer
- Richard Bedbrook (b. 1978), English cricketer
