= Bertha Lewis =

British opera singer and actress (1887–1931)

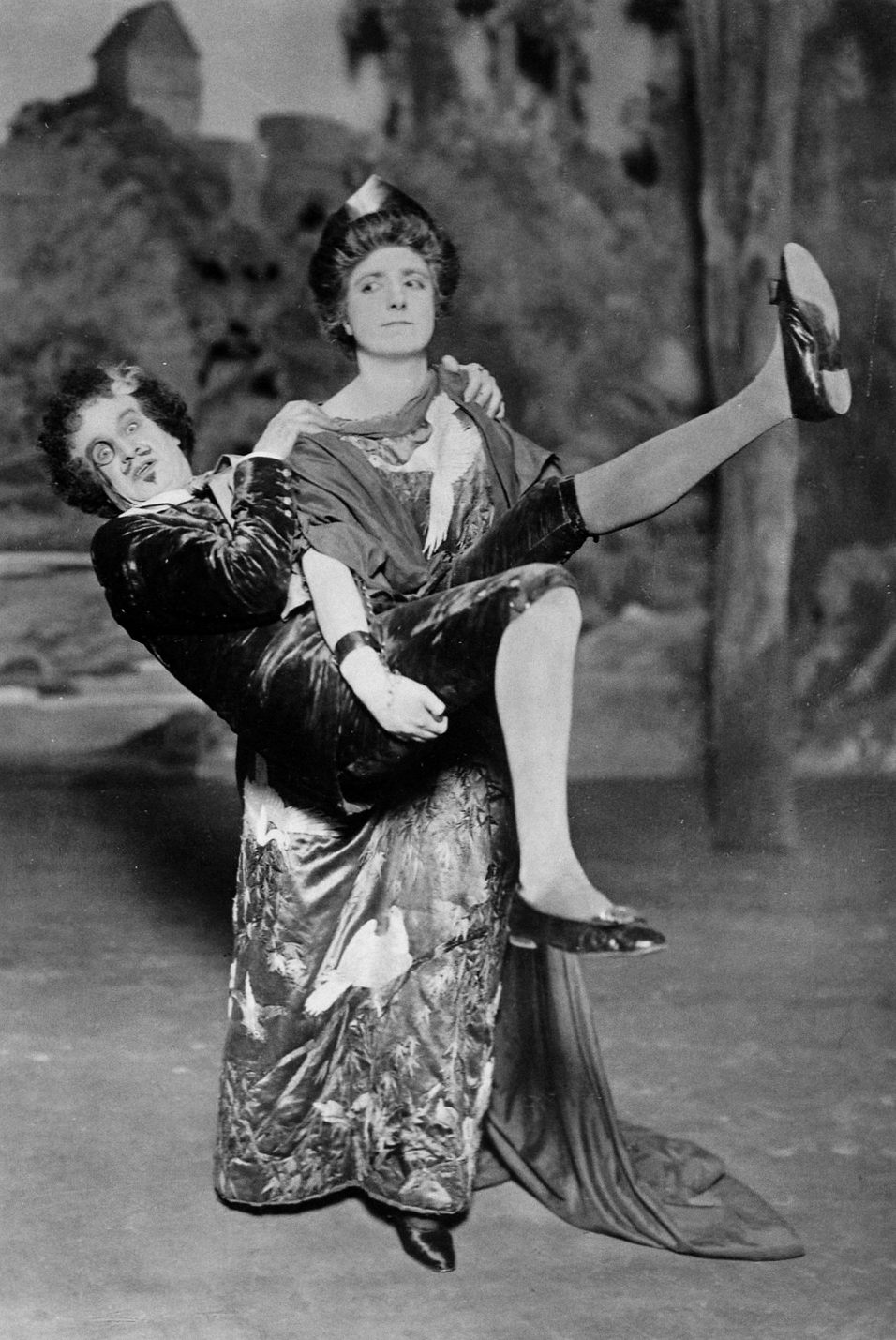
Lewis with Henry Lytton in Patience, 1922

Bertha Amy Lewis (12 May 1887 – 8 May 1931) was an English opera singer and actress primarily known for her performances as principal contralto in the Gilbert and Sullivan comic operas with the D'Oyly Carte Opera Company.

Born in London and trained at the Royal Academy of Music, Lewis began her professional career as a concert singer. In 1906 she joined the D'Oyly Carte Opera Company on tour, playing smaller roles. The year after her 1908 London début at the Savoy Theatre, she was promoted to playing the principal contralto roles in H.M.S. Pinafore, The Pirates of Penzance, The Mikado and the company's other Gilbert and Sullivan repertory. She left the company in 1910 and married the baritone Herbert Heyner, with whom she performed in concerts, among other appearances.

Lewis returned to D'Oyly Carte in 1914, resuming her engagement as principal contralto. For more than 16 years, she portrayed all the leading contralto characters in the company's repertory: She died at the age of 43 in 1931 after sustaining fatal injuries in a car accident while on tour. She is sometimes considered the greatest of all the principal contraltos of the D'Oyly Carte Opera Company.

== Life and career ==
=== Early life and career ===
Lewis was born in Forest Gate, London on 12 May, 1887, the eldest daughter of William Thomas Lewis and his wife Emily née Bacon. She was educated at the Ursuline Convent, Upton, and at the Royal Academy of Music, gaining an A.R.A.M. qualification. She appeared in amateur productions in east London mainly in farce, including Pinero's Dandy Dick, and made professional appearances on the concert platform.

In 1906, aged nineteen, Lewis joined the D'Oyly Carte Opera Company on tour, making her début at the Grand Theatre, Southampton, on 30 June 1906, as Kate in The Pirates of Penzance, and then playing Saphir in Patience, Leila in Iolanthe and Vittoria in The Gondoliers. In the following two years she added Ada in Princess Ida and First Bridesmaid in Trial by Jury to her roles. In 1908 she made her London début, at the Savoy Theatre, in the part of Gwenny Davis in Philip Michael Faraday and Frederick Fenn's A Welsh Sunset, a curtain raiser to H.M.S. Pinafore. Rejoining the D'Oyly Carte touring company in October 1908 she added Inez in The Gondoliers to her roles.

Early in the 1909–10 tour Lewis succeeded Ethel Morrison as principal contralto, playing Little Buttercup in H.M.S. Pinafore, Ruth in Pirates, Lady Jane in Patience, the Queen of the Fairies in Iolanthe, Lady Blanche in Princess Ida, Katisha in The Mikado, Dame Carruthers in The Yeomen of the Guard, and the Duchess of Plaza-Toro in The Gondoliers. She played those roles until March 1910, when she left the company. In the same year she married the baritone Herbert Heyner, with whom she performed in concerts. According to her entry in Who's Who in the Theatre she appeared in grand opera, in the title role of Bizet's Carmen, as Delilah in Camille Saint-Saëns's Samson and Delilah, and as Amneris in Verdi's Aida.

=== Principal contralto and death ===
Lewis returned to the D'Oyly Carte company in December 1914, replacing Louie René as principal contralto. For more than 16 years after her return, Lewis portrayed all of the leading contralto characters in the company's repertory: Lady Sangazure in The Sorcerer, Buttercup, Ruth, Lady Jane, Fairy Queen, Lady Blanche, Katisha, Dame Hannah in Ruddigore, Dame Carruthers, and the Duchess of Plaza-Toro.

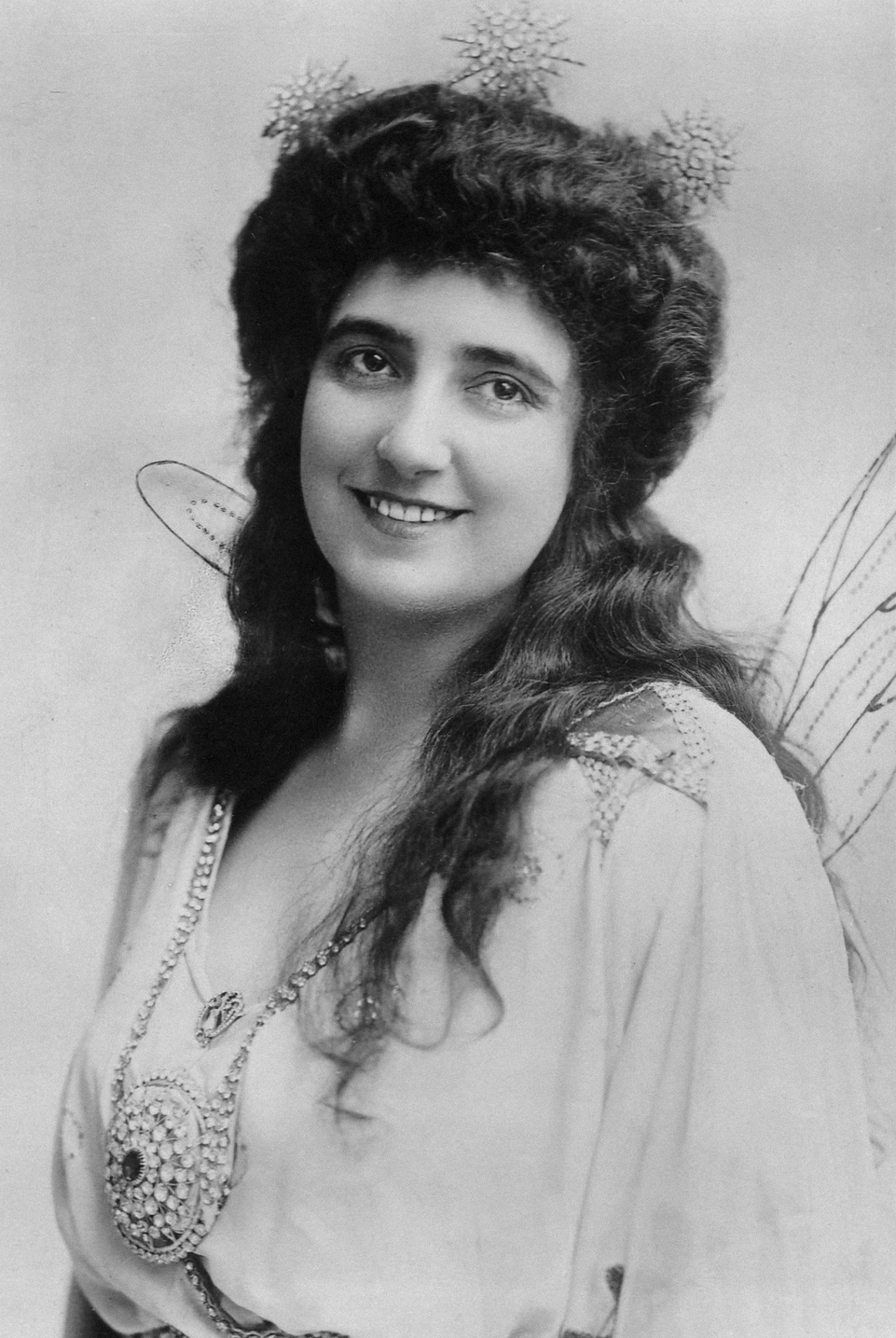

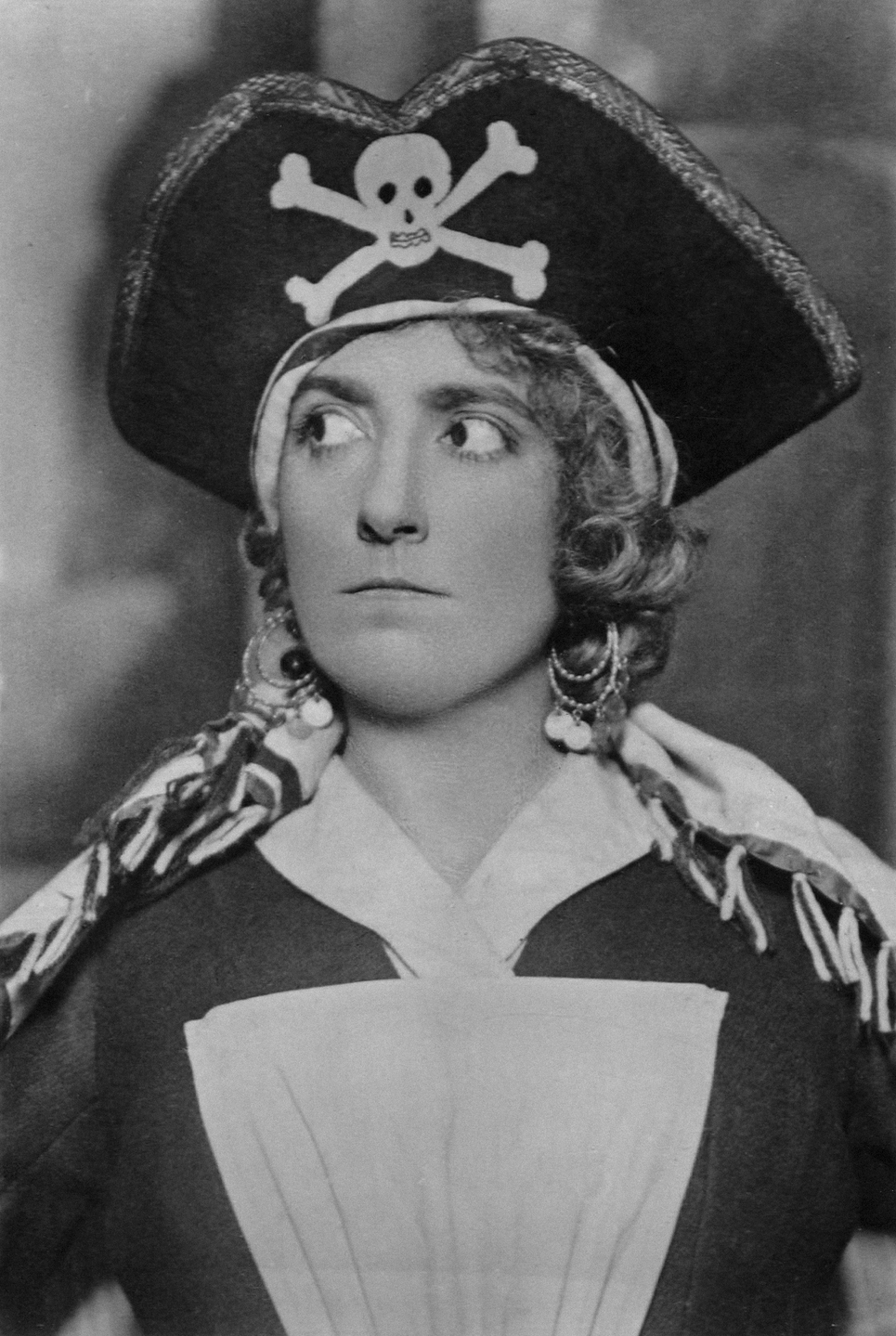

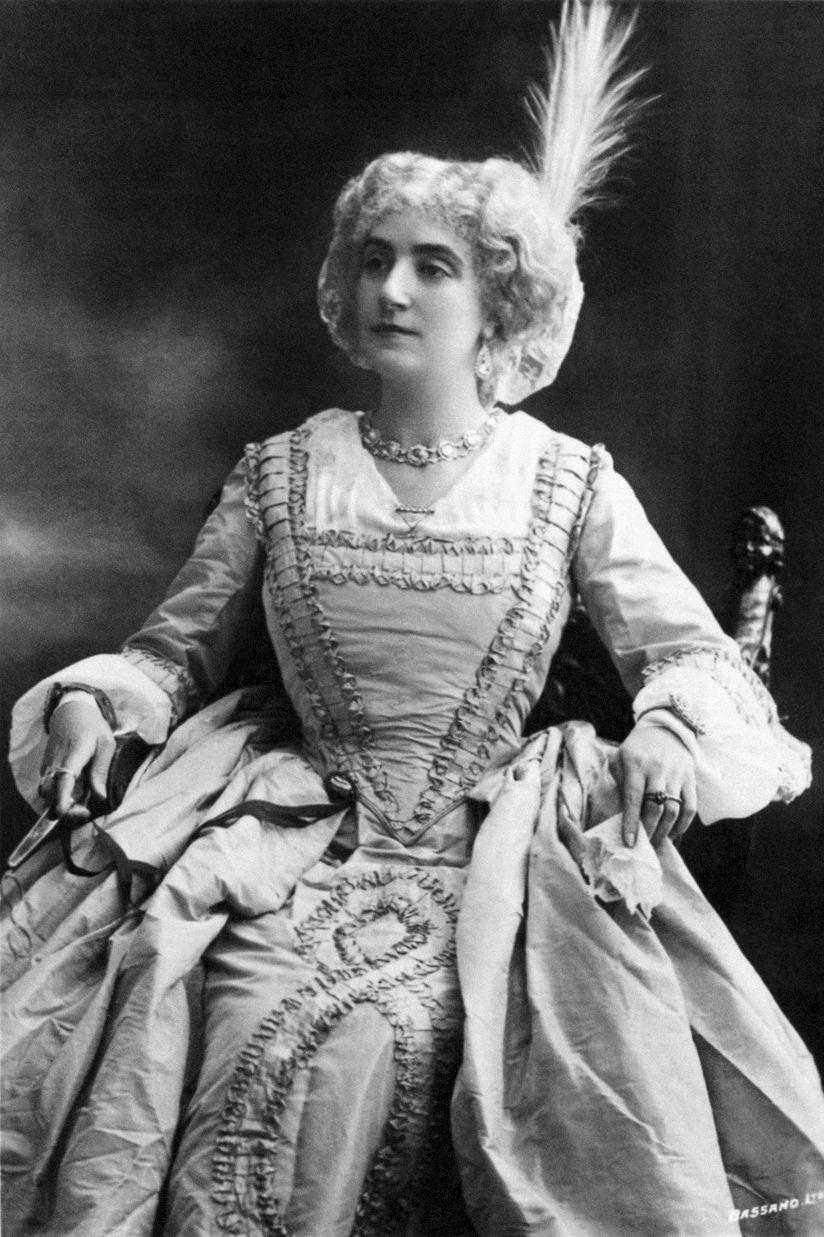

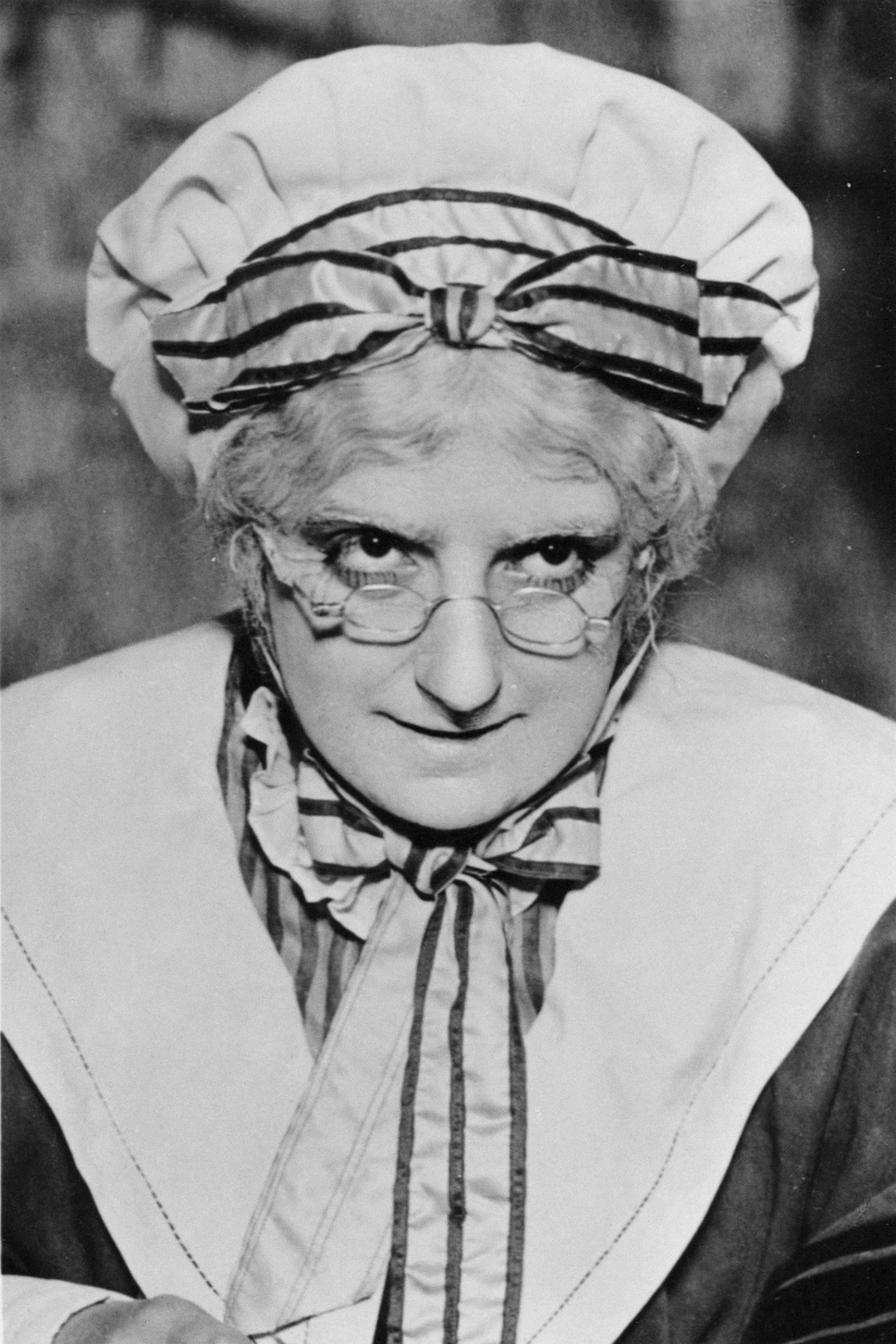

Lewis in five of her roles: (l to r) Fairy Queen, Lady Blanche, Ruth, Lady Sangazure and Dame Hannah

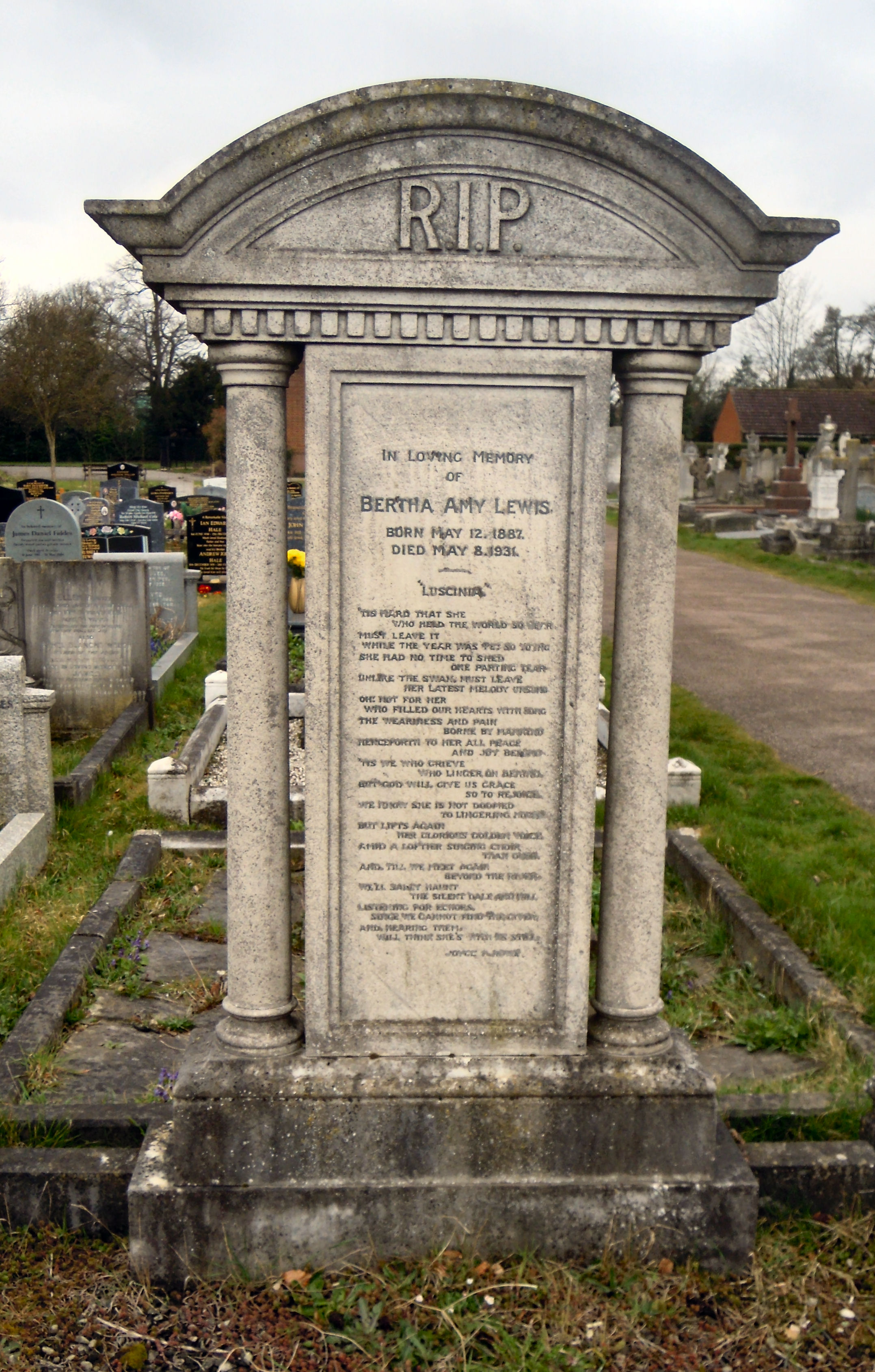
Grave of Bertha Lewis in Cambridge City Cemetery

Lewis died at the age of 43 in May 1931 after sustaining fatal injuries in a car accident. She was travelling from Manchester to Cambridge in a car driven by Henry Lytton in a rainstorm while the two were on tour with D'Oyly Carte. Lytton was injured in the accident but recovered and returned to performing after a few months. Lewis was in the hospital for five days before dying of her injuries. Queen Mary made personal enquiries, and the newspapers and the BBC gave daily news reports about her condition. She was buried in Cambridge City Cemetery and, although it was a double grave, she lies there alone. Her husband did not attend her funeral.

Lewis is sometimes cited as the greatest contralto in the history of the D'Oyly Carte Company. Her powerful voice (preserved on recordings), clear diction and formidable stage personality were praised. Of her performance in the production of The Mikado in 1926, The Times wrote that she "was majestic as Katisha ... getting a serious dramatic significance into her part and illustrating the fact that the humour of Gilbert and Sullivan comes out best by serious treatment". The critic Audrey Williamson wrote, "Gilbert has given [Katisha] the most dramatic entrance of almost any character in the operas, and few contraltos can have equalled the late Bertha Lewis in this scene. Majestic in presence, she took the stage like a thunderbolt".

== Recordings ==
With the D'Oyly Carte Opera Company, Lewis recorded Buttercup (part in 1922, all in 1930), Ruth (1931), Lady Jane (1930), Queen of the Fairies (1929), Lady Blanche (1924), Katisha (1926), Dame Hannah (1924) and The Duchess of Plaza-Toro (1927). She participated in a 1926 BBC radio broadcast of The Mikado, live from the opening night of the D'Oyly Carte London season, in a cast including Lytton, Darrell Fancourt, Leo Sheffield and Elsie Griffin, and appeared as Katisha in a four-minute silent promotional film made to promote that Charles Ricketts-redressed Mikado.

== Sources ==
- Ayre, Leslie (1972). The Gilbert & Sullivan Companion. London: W H Allen. ISBN 0396066348.
- Jones, Brian (2005). Lytton, Gilbert and Sullivan's Jester. London: Trafford Publishing. ISBN 1412054826.
- Rollins, Cyril; R. John Witts (1962). The D'Oyly Carte Opera Company in Gilbert and Sullivan Operas: A Record of Productions, 1875–1961. London: Michael Joseph. OCLC 504581419.
- Williamson, Audrey (1953). Gilbert and Sullivan Opera: A New Assessment. London: Rockliffe. OCLC 249910852.
