= 'Op o' Me Thumb =

1904 play by Frederick Fenn and Richard Pryce

Hilda Trevelyan, who created the main role, Amanda

'Op o' Me Thumb is a 1904 one-act play by the English authors Frederick Fenn and Richard Pryce. It was produced at the Court Theatre, London, on 13 March 1904, in a double bill with Robert Browning's A Soul's Tragedy. It transferred to the St James's Theatre on 24 April 1904. The leading role of Amanda was played by Hilda Trevelyan. The play was staged in New York in 1905 with Maude Adams as Amanda. It was filmed in 1920 as Suds, starring Mary Pickford in the role created by Trevelyan.

== Characters and original cast ==
- Madame Didier – Marianne Caldwell
- Clem (Mrs) Galloway – Annie Howard
- Rose Jordan – Margaret Busse
- Celeste – Florence Lloyd
- Amanda Afflick – Hilda Trevelyan
- Horace Greensmith – H Nye Chart

== Plot ==
The play is set in a London laundry. One of the workers, Amanda, fantasises about being the sweetheart of a handsome client, Horace, and tells her colleagues tall stories of their supposed romance. Horace arrives to collect his laundry; she confesses her deceit to him. Out of kindness he kisses her, and then goes, leaving Amanda alone, with her fantasies shattered but with the consolation of the kiss and his gold, diamond and ruby tie pin that he has given her.
