= Joan White =

British actor, director and educator (1909–1999)

White in 1950

Joan White (3 December 1909 – 8 June 1999) was a British actress, theatre director and educator who over a career that spanned 65 years became a popular figure on the London stage, appeared in films and television and produced and directed plays on both sides of the Atlantic, and trained many of the young to follow in her footsteps. She worked with such storied names as Laurence Olivier, Paul Scofield, Tyrone Guthrie, and Christopher Fry in their successes, and with others such as Rex Harrison, Mischa Auer and Tyrone Guthrie in their failures. As a master of the art of high comedy she entertained numberless audiences, and through her students left an indelible mark on the future of her profession.

== Early life ==
White was born on 3 December 1909 in Alexandria, where her father was managing the laying of undersea telegraph cables. Her parents were Henry and Kathleen White. Her father's work then took him and the family to Portugal, the Azores and Gibraltar. At age 12 Joan went to board at St Helen's School for Girls in Northwood, Middlesex. After this she entered the Royal Academy of Dramatic Art, and graduated in 1931.

While still at RADA, White applied to the Cambridge Festival Theatre where Tyrone Guthrie was directing. She was given an apprenticeship, and after the usual donkeywork was cast as Azorah in the first production of Tobias and the Angel by James Bridie. This show went on a tour to Glasgow in 1930.

== London ==
Next came a part in Leonid Andreyev's Betrayal, which was transferred to the Little Theatre in London, January 1931. David Horne and Flora Robson were in the cast. Producer Anmer Hall and Guthrie then moved the company to the Westminster Theatre in London, where a season was presented including Bridie's The Anatomist, Sierra's The Kingdom of God, Love's Labour's Lost and Six Characters in Search of an Author. White was cast in the premiere production of Jonah and the Whale by Bridie. The Sketch commented:

Joan White was witty and personable as Euodias, played in the vein of What Every Woman Knows.

A play by Guthrie himself, Follow Me, was not a success. White appeared in a film with Charles Hawtrey, The Melody-Maker.

Over 1933 and 1934, several plays in London theatres had very short runs, including Our Mutual Father with a young Rex Harrison. Ian Hay's A Present from Margate had 20 performances. In 1934, White was cast in an elaborate production of The Golden Toy at the London Coliseum. The cast included Peggy Ashcroft, Wendy Toye, and a dancing elephant called Rosie. This was a big success, with 185 performances. A film, Lucky Loser, followed.

In early 1935, White was cast in a revival of the highly successful The Barretts of Wimpole Street. This ran for 54 performances. This was followed by Ian Hay's film Admirals All. Over the summer, White was invited to Bexhill to direct I'll Leave It to You and Outward Bound.

== Girls ==
In September 1935, Charles B. Cochran called to ask if White could play a 16-year-old girl. She promptly answered "yes" and was cast in James Bridie's latest play, The Black Eye. This was to be the first of a series of plays in which White played a young girl. This one ran for three months.

On opening night in October 1935, George Bernard Shaw was in the audience, accompanying Elisabeth Bergner, who at that time was planning a film of As You Like It starring herself and Laurence Olivier. Watching White's performance, Shaw turned to Bergner and said "There's your Phoebe." Bergner concurred.

This was to be the first British sound film of Shakespeare. Despite its pastoral setting it was shot indoors at Elstree Studios. Trees and shrubbery had to be brought in, together with cows and sheep. All the vegetation had to be fireproofed. The sheep naturally enough ate the leaves, and the fireproofing caused havoc with their digestive tracts. The ensuing noise together with the rain on the roof caused extensive difficulties for the sound recordists.

In 1936 came another film, Second Bureau, a thriller. Then the play Children to Bless You presented White with another role as a child, this time unpleasant. Harold Hobson in the Christian Science Monitor described White's performance as "irresistibly horrid". But later that year White opened in what was to be the biggest hit of her career, Ian Hay's Housemaster, that ran with a break for over 600 performances. Her line in Act 3: "What do you mean, funny? Funny peculiar or funny ha-ha?" became a catch phrase.

== Television career ==
White made her first foray into television while television was still in its infancy. She played Sara in Tobias and the Angel from the BBC studios at Alexandra Palace in May 1938 with Tyrone Guthrie as the Angel. This was followed by the films You're the Doctor with Googie Withers and A Girl Must Live with Margaret Lockwood.

In February 1939, she appeared as another young girl in Little Ladyship, a Hungarian play adapted by Ian Hay and starring Lilli Palmer. The BBC broadcast the performance on TV from the Strand Theatre. White had to leave the company because of her advancing pregnancy; shortly after that World War II was declared, and theatre ground to a halt.

Apart from some BBC radio work, White's break from performing lasted until March 1943, when the New York hit Junior Miss opened at the Saville Theatre with two mischievous girls played by White and the young Peggy Cummins who at 17 was half White's age. The show ran for 517 performances followed by a tour with ENSA.

With the war over, White sought and found a part as an adult. This was in The Cure for Love, starring Robert Donat, in which she played the manipulating villainess. J. C. Trewin in the Observer described her as "deadlier than the Alamein barrage".

In 1946, came one of the highlights of her career, the West End premiere production of Christopher Fry's one-act, A Phoenix Too Frequent, with the young Paul Scofield. This retelling of a Roman tale was to be the start of a long association with Christopher Fry.

Television started again after its wartime hiatus and White appeared in several plays including the hit stage farce Tons of Money and Lovers Meeting. One feature film she appeared in was The Weaker Sex. She had a season at Birmingham Repertory Theatre in which notable parts included Richard III with Alan Badel and Diary of a Scoundrel.

== Back to school ==
In 1949, she started to teach part-time at her alma mater, RADA, and the Royal Central School of Speech and Drama. Her teaching career continued for six years. Among her students were Albert Finney, Alan Bates, Barry Foster and Sylvia Syms.

Seasons at Salisbury Arts Theatre and Bristol Old Vic followed, including appearing in Christopher Fry's The Lady's Not for Burning. In 1951 the London production of Storks Don't Talk, with White opposite the Hollywood star Mischa Auer, closed after five performances, having delighted audiences and critics on tour. (Photo at Getty.)

After a season at Dundee Repertory Theatre and appearing in I Capture the Castle in London, White began to direct more, first at Salisbury and then at Cardiff as well. Several television plays were mixed in, including Yellow Sands and her stage success The Cure for Love. But White was experiencing itchy feet, and in 1956 she moved to Canada, encouraged by Tyrone Guthrie, who was already there.

== To the New World ==
She started at the Crest Theatre in Toronto, directing Present Laughter and starring in Murder at the Vicarage. She moved on to produce and direct at the Grand Theatre in London, Ontario for two seasons. She was also in three plays for Canadian television. While at the Grand Theatre she worked with Robert Paine Grose, an American designer and director. White decided to move south to New York and she and Grose married.

It was not long before White was cast as Mrs Higgins in the US national tour of the Broadway historic success My Fair Lady. For a year she travelled with the company in comfort by train to the major cities in the US and Canada. On her return to New York she appeared in The Citadel on ABC TV with Carroll O'Connor.

== Summer Stock ==
In 1960, White and Grose were engaged to run the summer-stock season at the long-established Berkshire Playhouse in Stockbridge in western Massachusetts, a popular resort area. Over the next five years they presented a wide range of recent Broadway hits, classic revivals, musicals, and new arrivals. These included Come Blow Your Horn, A Streetcar Named Desire, My Fair Lady, The Teahouse of the August Moon, and Night Must Fall. They introduced Journey to Bahia by the Brazilian playwright Dias Gomes. Famous names such as Gloria Swanson and Gloria Grahame were pleased to take the trek from New York to appear.

The Groses also ran a drama school based at the theatre. The students could take chorus parts in the plays and work in the scene shop and the wardrobe.

For Shakespeare's quatercentenary they staged As You Like It in a bucolic setting inspired by Henri Rousseau, the Primitivist painter. They revived Cole Porter's little-known musical You Never Know, with White performing the title song.

The Silver Cord, a revival from the 1920s, was presented as celebrating the work of a local playwright; Sidney Howard lived nearby. Time had not been kind to the play, nor had it been to the star, Sylvia Sidney. The Berkshire Eagle commented, "Miss Sidney is burdened with hopelessly bad lines as the mother; she is kind enough to forget some of them."

Between summers, White appeared in plays in New York and Boston including Trelawny of the "Wells" and A Passage to India, as well as television. In 1963, White played Mrs Gladstone in Invincible Mr Disraeli on Hallmark. Disraeli was Greer Garson, who was a friend of White's in their days in London.

At the end of the 1964 season, the society that owned the Berkshire Playhouse decided not to renew the Groses' contract. For 1965 they bought the Yarmouth Playhouse on Cape Cod and presented a mix of fare including The Night of the Iguana, The Boy Friend, George Washington Slept Here, and plays for children in the daytime. Hermione Gingold and Eric Berry made a special appearance.

White spent part of that summer in Boston rehearsing and previewing the much-anticipated new musical by Lerner and Lane, On a Clear Day You Can See Forever. It turned out to be much too long, and White's role was cut out along with several others.

Roaming performances followed: Major Barbara in Boston, Serjeant Musgrave's Dance and Hugh Leonard's Stephen D in New York, and The Importance of Being Earnest and Misalliance in Cincinnati. There was also Blithe Spirit with Dirk Bogarde and Ruth Gordon for Hallmark TV.

In 1968, White spent a season at Nottingham Playhouse in England, including Queen Elinor in King John and, as described by the critic Alan Strachan,

Mrs Candour, dripping cloaked venom, like prussic acid on sugar cubes, in Jonathan Miller's pox-and-all reappraisal of The School for Scandal.

== Seattle ==
Back in the US, White joined the Drama Faculty of the University of Washington in Seattle, teaching and directing. One of her students was Patrick Duffy. In 1970, under the aegis of the university she initiated the English Summer Theatre School. Under this, students travelled to England to study and observe English drama and to perform.

White appeared with the Seattle Repertory Company in A Day in the Death of Joe Egg and in Hadrian VII and The Heiress (an adaptation of Henry James's Washington Square) at ACT Theatre.

In 1975, the university decided to discontinue subsidizing the summer school and White returned to New York where she continued the renamed Joan White English Theatre School, taking students to Dublin as well as London and the Edinburgh Festival. She formed an affiliation with Trinity College Dublin.

In the same period she appeared in The Devil's Disciple at Meadow Brook Theatre near Detroit. She then had a long national tour of Alan Ayckbourn's Bedroom Farce, followed by another production of the same play in Barrie, Ontario. Then it was Ayckbourn again in Just Between Ourselves in Princeton New Jersey.

In 1982, White was asked to understudy Eva Le Gallienne in a tour of To Grandmother's House We Go, bearing in mind the star's advancing age. This was followed by a revival (after 50 years) of Le Gallienne's production of Alice In Wonderland, including her performance as the White Queen. For this, White was also engaged as "alternate". This included White donning a harness to fly, not an easy task for a mature woman. (Photo at NYPL).

== Homeward Bound and The Next Stage Company ==
In 1983, White decided to return to London and to continue to operate the Joan White English Theatre School out of her flat in Chelsea. But she also embarked on an entirely new venture. Recent drama school graduates are faced with the problem of how to start a career in an over-crowded profession. In addition to sending out résumés and attending auditions, they need a way of practising their craft, working with audiences and providing means for agents and producers to see them.

She discussed the problem with Alan Sleath, chairman of the Associates of RADA, and other prominent graduates, and it was decided set up a new venture that would tackle the problem head on. The Next Stage Company was born with the support of RADA. It presented three plays a year on shoe-string budgets in church halls, churches, community theatres and on one occasion a West End theatre. The first production was Christopher Fry's The Boy with a Cart, the start of a long fruitful relationship with Fry. Other playwrights included Mike Leigh, Alan Ayckbourn, James Bridie, Noël Coward, Sean O'Casey, Neil Simon, Lillian Hellman, Chekhov, Vanbrugh, Shaw and Shakespeare. There was one musical: Godspell. Eminent members of the profession joined in to direct and act in the shows.

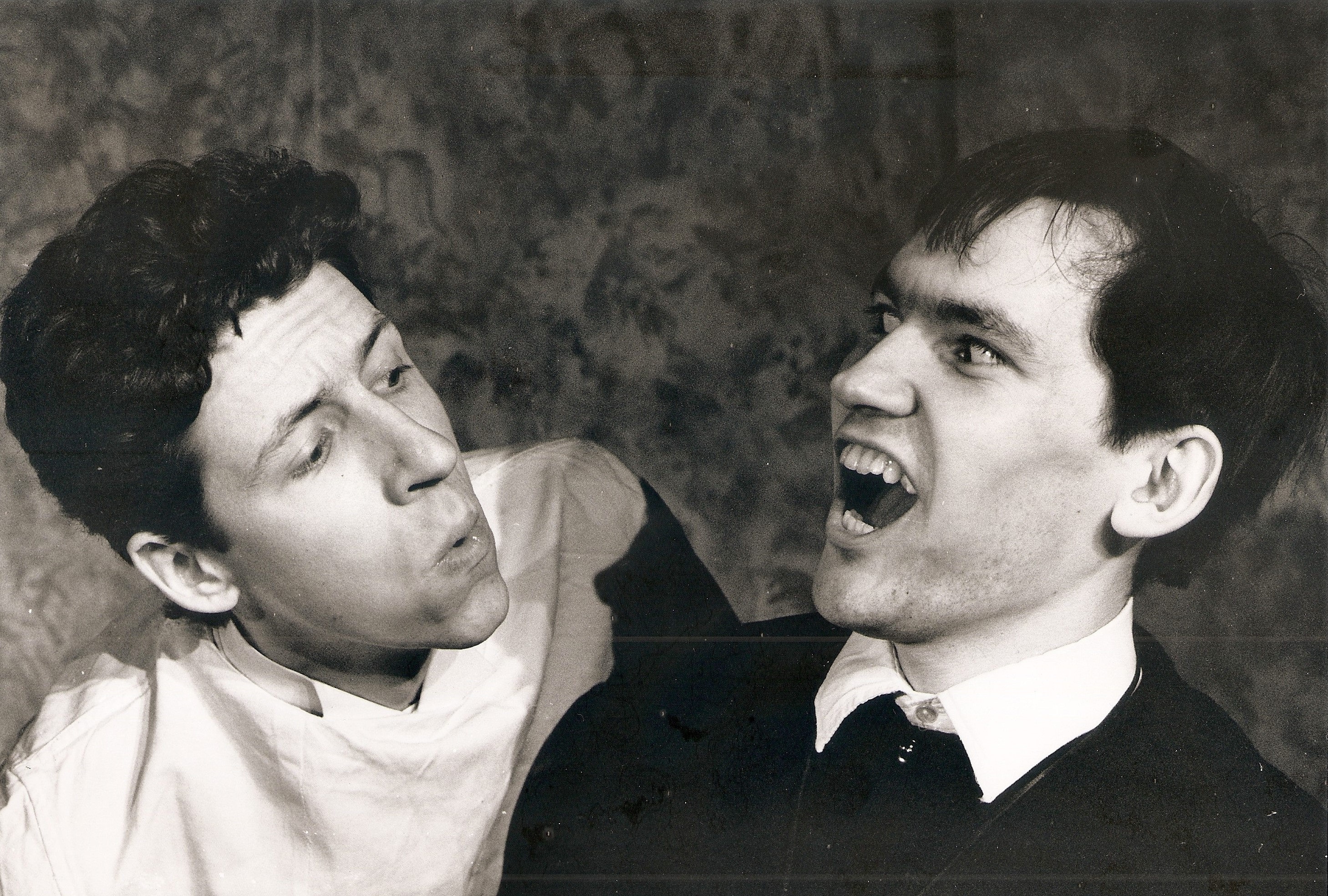
Ben Stollery and Jonathan Coote in Neil Simon's The Good Doctor, Next Stage Company, 1988

A notable coup for Next Stage was the premiere production in Chelsea Old Church of Christopher Fry's play One Thing More, about Caedmon, the Northumbrian shepherd turned monk who is known as the father of English sacred song. The company took the play to Whitby Abbey and presented it again in London in 1993.

While running the Next Stage Company, White started to wind down the Joan White English Theatre School and continued to pursue her own work. In 1986, she had a cameo role in Denis Potter's The Singing Detective on BBC TV. In 1988, she appeared at the National Theatre in Jim Cartwright's play Bed. She also had to row a boat playing the mother of the botanist David Bellamy in a TV commercial for baked beans.

In 1993, Beryl Bainbridge was reminiscing in an article in the Independent about her years as a young actress. She made an uncomplimentary remark about Joan White, with whom she had appeared in The Beaver Coat at Dundee Repertory Theatre in 1952, adding that White was "dead now". The Independent had to publish a grovelling apology, pointing out that White was busy directing a new play for the Chelsea festival.

On television she appeared on The Ruth Rendell Mysteries, Jeeves and Wooster, and Kinsey. Her last work was in 1994 on The Wimbledon Poisoner.

In 1995, the Next Stage Company presented its last show, a revival of Housemaster, and White moved to Denville Hall, the actors retirement home in Northwood. In July 1996, she gave an address at the memorial service for Greer Garson, her friend from London years. White died on 8 June 1999.

On 9 September, a memorial service was held at the Actor's Church in Covent Garden. Among the readers were Paul Scofield and Rosemarie Dunham.

== Personal life ==
White was married three times, first in 1933 to the playwright John Beanes. The marriage was annulled in 1935. In 1937 she married A.P. Moore, who managed the Duke of York's Theatre. They had two daughters, Susannah and Judy, and subsequently a host of grandchildren and great-grandchildren. The marriage was annulled in 1952. In 1958 she married the American theatre designer and director Robert Paine Grose. They divorced in 1966.

== Sources and further reading ==
- Wearing, J.P. (1990) The London Stage 1930–39, Scarecrow Press
- Wearing, J.P. (1991) The London Stage 1940–49, Scarecrow Press
- Wearing, J.P. (1993) The London Stage 1950–59, Scarecrow Press
- Strachan, Alan (1999) "Joan White" Independent 14 June
- Trewin, Wendy (1999) "Joan White" Guardian 20 June
- Forsyth, James (1976) Tyrone Guthrie: a biography. Hamish Hamilton
- Staber, Judy White (2022) Rise Above It, Darling, the story of Joan White, Actor, Director, Teacher, Producer and (sometimes) Mother. Staber is Joan White's younger daughter, currently in possession of White's extensive archive. The book is clearly not a disinterested source but it is useful and interesting.
- Who Was Who in the Theatre 1912–1976 (1978) Gale Research
