= A Welsh Sunset =

Comic opera composed by Philip Michael Faraday

A Welsh Sunset is a one-act comic opera composed by Philip Michael Faraday, with a libretto by Frederick Fenn. It was produced at the Savoy Theatre from 15 July 1908 and played with revivals of H.M.S. Pinafore and The Pirates of Penzance until 17 October 1908, and from 2 December 1908 until 24 February 1909, a total of 85 performances. A copy of the vocal score (published in 1908 by Metzler), but no printed libretto, is found in the British Library. The score contains all the dialogue.

A lawyer, Faraday composed songs and musical theatre pieces and managed English operetta companies in the years immediately prior to World War I. Two years earlier, he had composed the successful comic opera Amasis (1906) Fenn later adapted into English, with much success, The Girl in the Taxi (1912; produced by Faraday).

A review of A Welsh Sunset in The Times found the piece overly sentimental, especially the ending, but liked Jenny's opening song and the overture. It thought that the rest of the music had "no character". The Manchester Guardian also disliked the piece.

The fashion in the late Victorian era and Edwardian era was to present long evenings in the theatre, and so producer Richard D'Oyly Carte preceded his Savoy operas with curtain raisers, like A Welsh Sunset. W. J. MacQueen-Pope commented, concerning such curtain raisers:

This was a one-act play, seen only by the early comers. It would play to empty boxes, half-empty upper circle, to a gradually filling stalls and dress circle, but to an attentive, grateful and appreciative pit and gallery. Often these plays were little gems. They deserved much better treatment than they got, but those who saw them delighted in them. ... [They] served to give young actors and actresses a chance to win their spurs ... the stalls and the boxes lost much by missing the curtain-raiser, but to them dinner was more important.

== Synopsis ==
Jenny and Griffith are in love. Griffith has a great tenor voice and has been singing an audition for Covent Garden opera. It is evening, Jenny and her mother are waiting outside Mrs. Jones's Cottage on a Welsh hillside for the boys to come home from Bala. They are joined by the other village girls.

Griffith has been successful, and when he arrives he tells Jenny of the wonderful rich and famous life that awaits her in London. Jenny asks her lover to sing to her before he goes home. She says, "I feel tonight as though tomorrow wouldn't come for years and years." Griffith sings to her, saying that it is she in his heart that makes him sing. When the song is over, she appears to be asleep, and he takes her hand, but it is lifeless. He exclaims, "What's the good of fame and money now? It was for her, and now I can give her nothing!"

== Musical numbers ==
- No. 1. Solo for Jenny -- "Come my love, for I am crying"
- No. 2. Solo for Griffith with chorus -- "Heart of my soul"
- No. 3. Men's trio with chorus -- "In London he will be all the rage"
- No. 4. Solo for Griffith -- "Hush't lies the land"
- No. 5. Chorus -- "Westward where the sunlight dies"

== Cast information ==
The original cast was:

- Jenny Jones (A girl in weak health, betrothed to Griffith David) – Beatrice Meredith
- Griffith David (A young Welshman) – Strafford Moss
- Mrs. Jones (Jenny's mother) – Ethel Morrison

Village girls

- Mary Fewlass – Mabel Graham
- Nancy Raine – Beatrice Boarer
- Gwenny Davis – Bertha Lewis

Griffith's companions

- Owen Rhys – Leo Sheffield
- John Lloyd – Sydney Granville
- Morgan Llewellyn – Allen Morris
