= Housemaster (play) =

Comedy by Ian Hay

1936 cast. Seated, middle row, Kynaston Reeves as Ovington, Hilda Trevelyan as Barbara Fane, and Frederick Leister as Donkin, front, second from right, Joan White as Button

Housemaster is a comedy by the English playwright Ian Hay, first produced at the Apollo Theatre, London, on 12 November 1936, running for 662 performances. Under the title Bachelor Born, the play was presented on Broadway at the Morosco Theatre in January 1938, running for just over a year. A film was made of the play in 1938.

The play depicts the conflict between a wise housemaster and a puritanical younger headmaster at an English public school, with the action complicated by the unexpected incursion of two women and two girls who have to be accommodated in the otherwise all-male establishment.

== Background ==
Ian Hay had written fifteen plays since his first, Tilly of Bloomsbury (1919), most of them in collaboration with other writers – Seymour Hicks, P. G. Wodehouse, Stephen King-Hall, Guy Bolton, Anthony Armstrong, A. E. W. Mason and Edgar Wallace. Several of these plays were stage adaptions of novels. Hay had previously written and then published Housemaster as a novel earlier in 1936, before it was brought to the stage.

In his early years Hay had been a schoolmaster at Durham School and Fettes College. His biographer Patrick Murray suggests that the former, which had a strong rowing tradition, is the model for Hay's Marbledown School in Housemaster.

== Original casts ==
Housemaster was first produced at the Apollo Theatre, London, on 12 November 1936, and ran for 662 performances. The play transferred to America under the title Bachelor Born, and was presented on Broadway at the Morosco Theatre in January 1938, running for just over a year.

Hilda Trevelyan

	London	Broadway
Charles Donkin	Frederick Leister	Frederick Leister
Bimbo Faringdon	Tony Wickham	Lester Lonegan
Victor Beamish	Robert Craven	Gavin Muir
Frank Hastings	J H Roberts	Aubrey Mather
Ellen	Lesley Burton	Sally Fitzpatrick
Barbara Fane	Hilda Trevelyan	Phoebe Foster
Button Faringdon	Joan White	Peggy Simpson
Matron	Winifred Willard	Josephine Brown
Rosemary Faringdon	Rosalyn Boulter	Helen Trenholme
Chris Faringdon	Elizabeth Nolan	Jane Sterling
Philip de Pourville	John Ford	Stephen Ker-Appleby
Flossie Nightingale	Humphrey Morton	Arthur Gould-Porter
The Rev Edmund Ovington	P Kynaston Reeves	Philip Tonge
Sir Berkeley Nightingale	H G Stoker	Francis Compton
Travers	Henry Rayner	William Packer
Pop	Derek Blomfield	Gary McCully
Old Crump	Lawrence T Kitchen	Bertram Tanswell

== Synopsis ==
Charles Donkin is a long-established housemaster at Marbledown, an English public school. His closest confidant is Frank Hastings, the sceptical and sarcastic maths master. Hastings and the rest of the teaching staff, and their pupils, are discontented at the puritanical innovations imposed by Ovington, the recently appointed headmaster. Donkin, though privately sharing the discontent, strives loyally to keep the peace. Into this all-male establishment comes Barbara Fane, with her three nieces, the daughters of the late Angela Faringdon. Donkin was, it is implied, in love with Angela in his younger days, but she married Aubrey Faringdon, who has brought up his and Angela's three daughters with the aid of their aunt. With the girls now aged 20, 18 and 14, Barbara has decided they need a more stable home than Aubrey can provide, and with his agreement she has come to ask Donkin to fulfil his promise to the dying Angela to look after her daughters if needed. Room is found for them in Donkin's house on the strict understanding that the girls are not to mingle with and distract the 55 boys who board there. This condition is doomed from the outset. The glamorous elder girls cannot help distracting Donkin's older boys and his younger staff; the tomboy Button encourages the younger boys to defy Ovington's petty restrictions.

Rosemary, the eldest daughter, has two of Donkin's junior staff falling for her. She spurns the sporty "Beef" Beamish in favour of the gentle, artistic Philip de Pourville. The younger daughters, Chris and Button, encourage the boys of Donkin's house to defy the headmaster's latest and furiously-resented diktat: heedless of Marbledown's long tradition of rowing, Ovington has cancelled the school's participation in the local regatta, and placed the town and the river out of bounds for the duration of the regatta. The boys of Donkin's house openly defy Ovington and go into town en masse. Faced with this comprehensive defiance of the headmaster, Donkin feels obliged to offer his resignation, which Ovington instantly accepts.

Sir Berkeley Nightingale, uncle of one of Donkin's senior boys, uses his influence to have Ovington offered a suffragan bishopric. Ovington accepts, and Donkin is appointed headmaster in his place. News comes that Aubrey Faringdon is about to remarry; his fiancée is a sensible widow, whom Barbara considers a suitable stepmother for the girls. Rosemary will stay in England, and Chris and Button will live in Paris with their father and stepmother. Barbara is now free of her responsibilities; the younger girls convince Donkin that she will need looking after, and that it is his duty to marry her. Donkin, with many misgivings, steels himself to propose, but his colleague Frank Hastings anticipates him: Barbara and Hastings have had a private understanding for many years, and now that she is a free agent they are to be married. Rosemary and de Pourville also become engaged; Chris and Nightingale's 18-year-old nephew seem headed in the same direction. Donkin is happier than he has ever been – about to take over as headmaster of the school he loves, and left in peace as a contented old bachelor.

== Critical reception ==
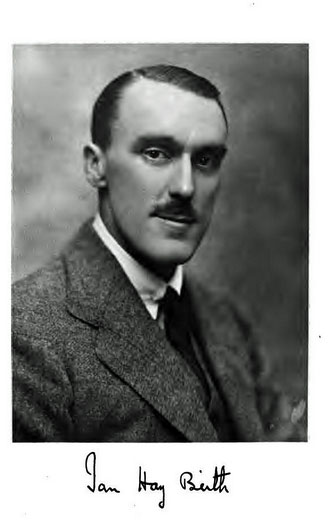
Autographed image of the author, 1921

The Play Pictorial commented, "Housemaster bears on every scene the unmistakable imprint of Ian Hay's master hand. No one is more conversant than he with school life, while his knowledge of the theatre ensures that the play develops with dramatic and humorous effect." The Times found the piece pleasing, but thought the romantic interludes involving Rosemary "have little sentimental interest and are not very funny"; it also thought that the author let the odious headmaster off too lightly to be dramatically satisfying. The Manchester Guardian commented:

This is a play for those who find joy in an amusing study of the contrasts between young and old, their foibles and their differences in type and character. The wide humanity of the housemaster himself, the youthful high spirits of the schoolboys and of the three Faringdon girls who shake the school to its foundations, and the conception of masters and school characters … give it virtues as a tonic in a weary world.

In The New York Times, Brooks Atkinson warned his readers that the English devotion to old school traditions might seem alien to American audiences, but he found the play, "a delightful comedy about pranks and crotchets in school".

== Revivals and adaptations ==
The play was given in the English provinces in 1937 by a touring company with Michael Logan as Donkin, and a young Richard Pearson as Flossie Nightingale. The play was first presented in the US at the Chestnut Street Opera House, Philadelphia, under its original title on 15 November 1937 and transferred as Bachelor Born to New York, where it opened at the Morosco Theatre, Broadway on 25 January 1938 and ran until 31 January 1939. Leister repeated his role of Donkin.

In a 1954 revival, Jack Hulbert played Donkin, with Winifred Shotter as Barbara Fane and Donald Hewlett as Beamish. A film of the play was made in 1938, with Kynaston Reeves reprising his role as Ovington, and Otto Kruger as Donkin.
