= Mary E. Mann =

Novelist and short-story writer who documented Norfolk rural life

Mary Elizabeth Mann née Rackham
- Born: 14 August 1848; Norwich, Norfolk, England
- Died: 19 May 1929 (aged 80); Sheringham, Norfolk, England
- Other names: Mary E. Mann
- Occupation: Novelist
- Years active: 1883 – 1918
- Known for: Chronicling Norfolk Rural Life
- Notable work: The short stories set in the fictional Dulditch

Mary Elizabeth Mann, née Rackham, (14 August 1848 – 19 May 1929) was a celebrated English novelist in the 1890s and early 1900s. She also wrote short stories, primarily on themes of poverty and rural English life. As an author she was commonly known as Mary E. Mann.

== Life ==
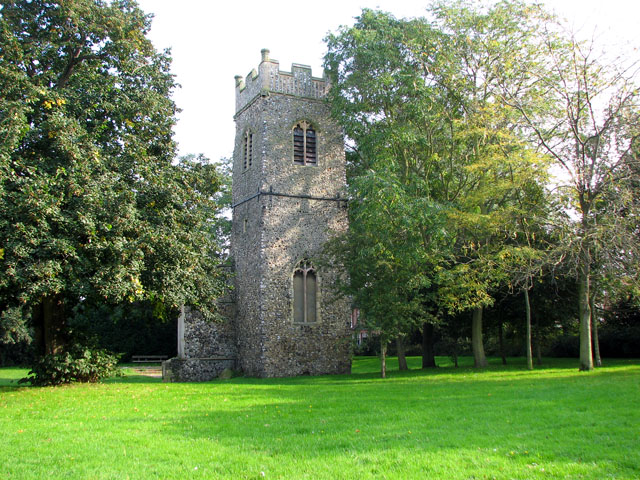
The church where Mann was baptised was destroyed by bombing in the Second World War. Only the tower now remains

Mary Rackham was born in Norwich to a merchant family on 14 August 1848. and she was baptised on 17 September in Heigham Parish Church in Norwich. Little is known about her early years, although Taylor states that she spent much of her childhood in the imposing family residence of Town Close House.

After her marriage on 28 September 1871 to Fairman Joseph Mann, a farmer with 800 acres, she moved to Shropham, Norfolk. Her husband was a churchwarden and A parish guardian; she also became involved with the workhouse, and visited the sick and other unfortunates of the parish, her observations and experiences informing her stories. Sutherland notes that lived in Norfolk her whole life, and wrote about the rural life in East Anglia that she knew so well.

She took up writing in the 1880s in order to relieve the tedium of daily life in what must have been, after her upbringing in Norwich, a remote and uninteresting country village. Her literary efforts were initially guided by Thomas Fairman Ordish, the son of her husband's sister, a literary-minded civil servant who became a notable Shakespearian scholar. Mann published her first novel, The Parish of Hilby (1883) at her own expense, probably on commission. (Note: At the time, there were five ways in which books might be published: These were: Outright sale of copyright. The publisher took the whole risk, but could make large profits. Jane Austen for example sold the rights of Pride and Prejudice for £110 and saw the publisher make a profit of £450 on the first two editions alone. Sometimes the sale of copyright was limited to a number of copies or a number of years.; Profit sharing. The publisher runs the risk, although sometimes the author is asked to contribute a fixed amount, and shared the profits with the author. This is subject to the risk that the publisher inflates the costs, to reduce the apparent profit.; Royalties. The publisher takes the risk and agrees to pay royalties on every copy, on every copy over a certain number, on every copy after production costs are met (subject to the risk of inflated costs). Sometimes the royalties could increase after a particular number of copies. Mann seems to have sold her books on a variation of a royalty system with an initial down-payment by the publisher to secure the right to publish an edition, and then royalty payments based on sales of the book. (Note: Aldis and Inder calculate that Susannah must only have sold sixteen or seventeen copies, as the royalties at 10% amounted to only 9s 9d. However, when a down-payment is made, royalties were usually only paid after a given number of copies are sold, typically the number of copies needed to cover the down payment at the given royalty rate or less.) At the start of her career, Man could usually get a down-payment of £40, but this increased to £300 when her popularity was at its height. Bently paid Mann £40 for The Lost Estate plus another £35 if they sold more than 500 copies.; Publishing on commission. The author takes the risk, pays the costs of publishing, and the publisher takes a commission on each book sold (again subject to the risk of inflated costs). This is nowadays frowned upon as vanity publishing, but it was regarded as a legitimate form of publishing in the 19th century - this was the system that Jane Austen and many Victorian authors used. The Parish of Hilby was published at Mann's own risk so it was probably published on this basis.; Publishing on subscription, used more in the seventeenth and eighteenth centuries, where a number of subscribers agree to buy a copy and the money is used to pay for publication. The publisher might be paid a commission on sales. This was the way in which Ryno Greenwall's encyclopaedic Artists and Illustrators of the Anglo-Boer War was published, along with a sponsor to backstop the costs.) and it was well received by the critics. Man refused an offer of £12 from the Family Herald to serialise the book. Kemp notes that her early fiction was published anonymously.

This began a career that spanned more than thirty years during which she published thirty three novels, hundreds of short stories, and fourteen plays, of which at least two were staged in London. Her work was largely focused on the experiences of rural life in Norfolk from labourers to yeoman farmers during the late 19th century agricultural and economic upheaval.

She had four children, one boy and three girls. After her husband's death in 1913, she moved to Sheringham, where she died aged 80. Her grave is in the churchyard of St Peter and St Paul, Shropham. Her grave-marker is a carved open book with the epitaph We bring our years to an end, as if it were a tale that is told.

== Works ==
Shropham was renamed 'Dulditch' in her novels, reflecting her view of the village as isolated and bleak. She wrote Tales of Dulditch while living at Manor Farm which inspired her view of rural life during the early 20th century. Formerly regarded as a novelist belonging to the ‘earthy’ rural genre, her short stories in Tales of Victorian Norfolk are grim but authentic accounts of poverty and deprivation. Often described by some as Norfolk's Thomas Hardy, Mann was admired by D. H. Lawrence.

Novels include Mrs Day's Daughters, and The Patten Experiment (1899) where a group of well-meaning middle class folk try to live on a labourer's wage for a week.

Her work has recently been rediscovered as a major contributor to East Anglian literature, championed among others by A. S. Byatt, who in 1998 included her story Little Brother in The Oxford Book of English Short Stories. Byatt said that she had been introduced to Mann's writings by D. J. Taylor. Taylor suggests that this is one of the grimmest stories in Victorian fiction. In the story a mother gives the corpse of a still-birth boy to her living children to play with as a doll. Byatt calls the story plain, and brief, and clear and terrible though the narrator's tone is not simple. Byatt goes on to say that Mann is recording, not judging but her telling is spiky with morals and the inadequacy of morals.

Taylor, who wrote the entry for Mann in Oxford Dictionary of National Biography in 2004, considers her best work to be not her novels but short fiction written in the 1890s such as Ben Pitcher's Elly, Dora o' the Ringolets and The Lost Housen, arguing them to be the equal of Hardy's but based on a matter-of-fact mood rather than Hardy's "vengeful determinism". These stories are collectively known as the Dulditch stories, and Taylor wrote a foreword to an anthology of thirty two of her Dulditch stories in 2008 as The Complete Tales of Dulditch. Taylor considers that it was Mann's first-hand observation of a community enmired in the 1880s agricultural depression that gives her best work its sheen. Richard King in The Tatler also considered that Mann was a writer whose greatest success lay in her short stories. The Scotsman said of her short stories that . . . Mann, has the talent of making her comedies, and tragedies complete and impressive within brief compass; and most of them have a touch of originality.

Mann's work can be grim and unpleasant. The Times notes that she did not shirk from showing the ugliness of life whether describing the rich or poor. Part of Mann's grimness come from her refusal to sugar-coat reality or ignore the most probable outcomes. The Scotsman said that Mann . . . never evades a logical conclusion. Her personages may not always suggest a very flattering view, of human nature, but such as they are, their fortunes are conducted with a scrupulous regard for probability, and there are no attempts to play tricks with the emotions of the reader, at the expense of his intelligence. The lost heir is a recurring trope in Victorian fiction. G. A. Henty had one of his heroes stolen as a toddler, (Note: In Henty's For Name and Fame: With Roberts to Cabul or Through Afghan Passes (Blackie, London, 1885), the hero Thomas Rippon is stolen by a Gypsy in revenge for the jailing of her husband. He is placed in a workhouse in Norfolk, grows up there and is apprenticed to a fishing smack. However, the additional love and attention he got from the wife of the gatekeeper of the workhouse, help to ensure that he never becomes coarse, and is fitted to sit alongside his father when he is eventually discovered.) and another lost to his father's family (Note: In Henty's By Conduct and Courage: a story of the days of Nelson (Blackie, London, 1904) the hero William Gillmore is orphaned as a toddler, and is only saved from the workhouse by the small sum in his father's purse being enough to help a local fisherman buy a new boat. He is apprenticed to the fisherman and after many adventures is a fit person to stand as heir to his grand-fathers title and estates.) but both acquire, through fortunate circumstances, the manners and polish of gentlemen, rather than being what one would expect from their upbringing in the workhouse or as fisher-lads. In contrast, when the lost child is discovered in Mann's The Victim (1917) the child is exactly what her experience of neglect, the workhouse, domestic service, and an unsatisfactory husband could be expected to make her, a foul-mouthed slattern.

Some of Mann's novels continue to be republished. (Note: See, for example WorldCat or the dates on the books found by searching Google Books for works by her.) In 2005, Eastern Angles Theatre Company used a collection of her characters and stories to create a new play A Dulditch Angel. It was directed by Orla O'Loughlin and written by Steven Canny.

== Longer Works by Mann ==
The following list is based on searches at Jisc Library Hub Discover. (Note: The Jisc Library Hub Discover brings together the catalogues of 165 Major UK and Irish libraries. Additional libraries are being added all the time, and the catalogue collates national, university, and research libraries.) The list is not necessarily exhaustive. Note that at the time of posting (12 August 2020), there are only two books by Mann on Project Gutenberg, whereas the British Library has eleven titles available online and the HathiTrust ten, five of which are in common. The republication dates given in the notes are from.

Longer works by Mann
Ser	Year	Title	Publisher	Pages	Notes
1	1883	The parish of Hilby: a simple story of a quiet place	Elliot Stock, London	iv, 351 p., 8º	(Note: Republished in 1903 by Methuen, as a new edition. The price for the new edition is not stated, but most of the other novels in the advertisement are six shillings. The Bristol Mercury said We have seldom read a more gracefully-written Idyll, odorous of English rural life, and thoroughly true to nature . . ., than is presented in this volume and In every case the personages are most incisively and humorously portrayed, and we seem to be actually watching and listening to living men and women.)
2	1885	Confessions of a Coward and Coquette. Being the record of a short period of her life as told by herself.	Ward & Downey, London	303 p., 8º	(Note: The Morning Post said: The sensational incidents of the book do not conceal the poor material of which it is constructed. Available online at the British Library.)
3	1886	Mrs. Peter Howard	Smith, Elder, London	2 v., 8º	(Note: Republished in 1903 by Methuen. in a new edition as a Methuen Popular Novel at six shillings, and as a Methuen sixpenny novel (Note: There were 300 sixpenny novels issued in 1903 by various publishers. Typically, these were reprints. Methuen may have used the stereotypes, or their flongs, from the six shilling novel to print the sixpenny novel without any need to reset the type, reducing costs by using cheaper paper, smaller margins, simpler binding, and board covers.) in 1904. This story of a young woman married to an odious husband attracted mixed reviews. Truth called it an absolutely nauseous study of vulgarity. The Graphic said: There is a little too much of the tendency to coarseness which so many writers mistake for strength, but this is the only conspicuous note of feebleness in a novel which certainly ranks above the average. The Morning Post says: In short, although it is to be regretted that a more healthy tone does not reign in this tale it shows undeniable proof of the development of its author's talent. Available online at the British Library in two volumes.)
4	1889	A lost estate	Richard Bentley, London	3 v., 8º	(Note: Republished in 1904 by Methuen. as a Methuen Popular Novel at six shillings. It was published in the March 1905 edition of The Novelist, a monthly Methuen magazine that featured long novels by popular authors at the price of sixpence. Each number of the magazine was said to be as long as an average six-shilling novel. The Morning Post called the story far from pleasant, and the bounds of good taste are transgressed in many of the author's scenes that, were they not lacking in power, might be termed Zolaesque, and that Mann's talent lies in another direction as can be seen . . . in her charming pictures of life in the tranquil parsonage. . . St. James's Gazette said that despite the flaws in the book there are some strong characters in it, and the Plot shows considerable powers of invention. Available online at the British Library in three volumes. Available online at the HathiTrust in a single volume.)
5	1890	One another's burdens	Richard Bentley & Son, London	3 v. ([6], 304; [6], 276; [6], 277, [3] p.), 8º	(Note: Republished in 1904 by Methuen. The Graphic says: One special merit in the novel is the skill with which its many portraits are contrasted, so that the strong points of each are brought into the highest possible relief. St. James's Gazette said that the book is a decided improvement the author's last effort, but the rather reckless way in which the characters are run over by railway trains and die of heart-disease—two of them do this—is trying to one’s nerves. Available online at the British Library in three volumes, and at the HathiTrust as a single volume.)
6	1891	A winter's tale	R. Bentley & Son, London	2 v., 8º	(Note: Missing details from press notices. Republished in 1904 by Methuen, as a Methuen Popular Novel at six shillings. Reissued in 1909 as a Methuen sixpenny novel. The Morning Post stated that Mann has done far better work than this and that Miss Mann has done much with somewhat poor materials, without, however, being equal to herself. The Graphic said that the work is by no means of first-class order but even so it was above-average fiction. Available online at the British Library in two volumes. Available online at the HathiTrust in a single volume.)
7	1893	Perdita	R. Bentley & Son, London	2 v., 8º	(Note: Missing details from press notices. Available online at the British Library in two volumes.)
8	1893	In Summer Shade	H. Henry & Co, London	3 v., 8º	(Note: Missing details from press notices. Republished first in 1902 and again in 1914 by John Long. Issued as John Long Sixpenny Novel in March 1904. Available online at both the British Library in three volumes, and at the HathiTrust in three volumes.)
9	1895	Susannah	H. Henry & Co, London	viii. 403 p., 8º	(Note: Republished in 1899 by T. Fisher Unwin. Available online at both the British Library, and HathiTrust.)
10	1896	There was once a Prince	H. Henry & Co, London	313 p., 8º	(Note: Republished in 1904 by Methuen. Second edition with a pen and ink frontispiece by Alan Wright. Available online at the British Library.)
11	1897	When Arnold comes home	Henry & Co, London	258 p., 8º	(Note: Republished in 1904 by Methuen. The Globe says that this is a graceful, sympathetic story of a man and a child and that the whole story is bright and engaging.)
12	1898	The Cedar star	Hutchinson and Co., London	vi. 347 p., 8º	(Note: Missing details from press notices. Issued as a Methuen sixpenny novel in 1903. Republished in 1919 by Methuen. Available online at both the British Library, and HathiTrust.)
13	1899	Moonlight	T. Fisher Unwin, London	vii. 291 p., 8º	(Note: Missing details from press notices. Available online at the British Library.)
14	1899	Out in Life's Rain	Hutchinson & Co, London	336 p., 8º	(Note: With 39 illustrations by Myra Luxmoore.)
15	1899	The Patten Experiment	T. Fisher Unwin, London	vii, 307 p., 8º	(Note: Republished by Methuen as a Methuen Sixpenny Novel in 1908.)
16	1901	Among the Syringas	T. Fisher Unwin, London	vi. 297 p., 8º	(Note: This is the story of a young woman with a complicated love life, where her choice of partner is constrained by economic necessity, but she is then forced into daily contact with her former love. The Pall Mall Gazette referred to it as that very excellent novel. It was serialised in several papers in England including the Lowestoft Journal and the Ipswich Journal under the title Among the Syringas. It was also serialised in other newspapers, including the Islington Gazette and the Bradford Daily Telegraph under the title Loved by Two Women.)
17	1901	The mating of a dove	T. Fisher Unwin, London	vi, 295 p., 8º	
18	1902	Olivia's summer	Methuen, London	v. 300 p., 8º	
19	1902	The fields of Dulditch	Digby, Long & Co., London	320 p., 8º	(Note: A collection of 12 short stories. This was Mann's first published collection of short stories. The Dundee Courier says that the book is unpalatable and questions if it can be recommended for the shelves of a home library saying There is a great deal of good writing within the covers, and a great deal not good. The Pall Mall Gazette says that while the book is not up to level of Mann's best work, There is the same sympathetic insight displayed here that characterized all the writer’s work—the same keen sense of humour and the same delicious portrayal of child-life and that the book is certainly eminently readable.)
20	1903	Gran'ma's Jane	Methuen, London	vii. 305 p., 8º	(Note: Published as a Methuen Popular Novel at six shillings.)
21	1904	It Answered	'Daily Mail', London	ff. 12, 8º	
22	1905	Fortune's Cap	Hurst & Blackett, London	315 p., 8º	
23	1905	The Parish Nurse	Methuen & Co, London	309 p., 8º	(Note: Republished in 1905 by Methuen as one of Methuen's popular novels, priced at six shillings.)
24	1906	Rose at Honeypot	Methuen & Co, London	vi, 308 p., 8º.	(Note: Second edition. The Norfolk Chronicle said: It is in relating the experiences of Rose at Honeypot that the authoress has given the reader those vivid and realistic touches of rural life as it is lived in the agricultural villages that make the work the best and most interesting that Mrs. Mann has yet written. Available online at the HathiTrust.)
25	1906	The Eglamore Portraits	Methuen & Co, London	v, 319 p., 8º	(Note: Available online at the HathiTrust.)
26	1907	The memories of Ronald Love	Methuen & Co, London	vii, 312 p., 8º.	(Note: The Times called this an unpleasant book in her obituary.)
27	1907	The sheep and the goats	Methuen & Co, London	8º.	(Note: A Methuen Popular Novel ast six shillings. Republished in 1912 by the Amalgamated Press as a Daily Mail sixpenny novel)
28	1908	A sheaf of corn	Methuen, London	vii, 312 p., 8º	(Note: Second edition. A collection of short stories. Published in Methuen's Popular Novels at six shillings. Available on Project Gutenberg.)
29	1908	The Heat-Smiter	Methuen & Co, London	305 p., 8º	
30	1909	Avenging children	Methuen, London	vii. 310 p., 8º	(Note: Published as a Methuen Popular Novel at six shillings.)
31	1910	Astray in Arcady	Methuen & Co, London	[4], 308, 31, [1] p., 8º., 8º	
32	1910	Bound Together	Mills & Boon, London	v. 302 p., 8º	(Note: A collection of short stories.)
33	1910	Little Mrs. Cummin. A comedy in three acts.	Samuel French, London	97 p., 1 p., 8º	(Note: This was adapted by Richard Pryce from Mann's novel The Eglamore Portraits. The play was first performed on 1 December 1909 at the Playhouse. The London Evening Standard considers that while the play was distinctly jolly, it was not that funny. The plot centred on a mother-in-law secretly working against her son's wife. Available online at the HathiTrust.)
34	1910	The Visit. A play in one act.	Samuel French, London	24 p.	(Note: This was an adaptation by Richard Pryce of a story by Mann called Freddy's Ship. The play was first performed on 1 December 1909 at the Playhouse, as a curtain raiser for Little Mrs Cummin. The London Evening Standard called the play a serious little play and was complimentary about the play and the actors. The one-act play concerned a woman trying to keep the news of the death of someone from his mother. Available online at the HathiTrust.)
35	1911	There was a Widow	Methuen & Co, London	vi. 309 p., 8º	
36	1912	Men and Dreams	Mills & Boon, London	v. 312 p., 8º	(Note: This is a collection of twenty-two short stories.)
37	1913	Mrs. Day's daughters	Hodder & Stoughton, London	311 p., 8º	(Note: A family suffers a reversal of fortune, and one daughter is industrious while the other is idle. While the Daily Mirror called this a most touching story. The Northern Whig said that the book seemed to be intended for younger girls and that Mann was capable of infinitely hotter things. However, the Dublin Daily Express considered that this was one of the most delightful novels we have read for some time and welcomed the book as being a departure from so-called modernism and a return to the quieter style of the mid-Victorian era. Available online at the HathiTrust, and on Project Gutenberg.)
38	1913	Through the window	Mills & Boon, London	319 p., 8º.	(Note: This is a collection of twenty-one short stories. The Scotsman said that in every one of them is revealed something of the author's sympathetic power of reading and portraying character and her skill as a storyteller.)
39	1915	Grandpapa's granddaughter	Mills & Boon, London	vi, 296 p., 8º.	(Note: The Yorkshire Post said that this is a simple pleasant story. . . and that though slight in its motive, is very good reading. The Tatler was far more critical describing the story as not raising an inch above its milk-and-watery title, and that while Mann was always worth reading, this effort is scarcely worth reading twice.)
40	1916	When a man marries	Hodder & Stoughton, London	319 p., 8º	(Note: The Illustrated London News said that the novel had no touch of reality and the characters did not succeed in touching either our hearts or our imagination.)
41	1917	The victim	Hodder & Stougton, London	320 p., 8º	(Note: The wife of an Indian official falls in love with a handsome young army officer and runs off with him. He abandons her just before the birth of her child. The child is consigned to the workhouse. Almost destitute she appeals to her husband for help. He accepts here back and they fall in love afresh. Years later, as a widow, she meets the army officer and they go looking for the child, only to find the slattern, foul-mouthed wife of a fisherman, the true victim of their deeds. The Scotsman says that in this book Mann . . . continues with an equal thoroughness and success those methods which have made her one of the most artistic of contemporary British novelists.)
42	1918	The Pedlar's Pack	Mills & Boon, London	242 p., 8º	(Note: A collection of short stories. Truth said that Mann seemed to have supped full of horrors and then dreamed the nightmare stories in the collection. However, even though all but two stores are . . . more or less grim or ghastly, yet as being Miss Mann's, you cannot if you once begin one fail to finish it.)
