= What Every Woman Knows (1917 film) =

- Directed by: Fred W. Durrant
- Based on: the play What Every Woman Knows by J.M. Barrie
- Starring: Hilda Trevelyan; Madge Tree; Maud Yates
- Production company: Barker-Neptune
- Distributed by: Lucoque Films
- Release date: August 1917
- Country: United Kingdom
- Language: English

What Every Woman Knows is a 1917 British comedy drama film directed by Fred W. Durrant and starring Hilda Trevelyan, Madge Tree and Maud Yates. It is an adaptation of the 1908 play What Every Woman Knows by J.M. Barrie. American versions were filmed in 1921 and 1934.

== Premise ==
A young Scottish woman has an arranged marriage with a rising politician and becomes the secret behind his success. However their relationship is threatened by the arrival of a glamorous English socialite who threatens to steal her husband away.

== Partial cast ==
- Hilda Trevelyan - Maggie Wylie
- Maud Yates - The Comtesse
- Madge Tree - Mother
- A.B. Imeson
