= The Girl in the Taxi =

Musical by Frederick Fenn and Arthur Wimperis

Arthur Playfair, Robert Averell, Yvonne Arnaud and Alec Fraser in the original production, 1912.

The Girl in the Taxi is the English-language adaptation by Frederick Fenn and Arthur Wimperis of the operetta Die keusche Susanne (Chaste Susanne, 1910 in Magdeburg), with music by Jean Gilbert. The German original had a libretto by Georg Okonkowski and was, in turn, based on a French play, Fils à papa, by Antony Mars and Maurice Desvallières. The story begins with a man and a woman, both married, who flag the same taxi and then decide to share it, as they have the same restaurant destination. Various naughty supper rendezvous, and much hiding under tables or behind screens, ensue.

The musical opened at the Lyric Theatre in London, produced by Philip Michael Faraday, on 5 September 1912 and ran for 385 performances. It starred Yvonne Arnaud as Suzanne, Arthur Playfair as Baron Dauvray, and Charles H. Workman as M. Pomarel. B. W. Findon, writing in The Play Pictorial called this "The merriest of musical farces" The piece toured internationally, including a production by J. C. Williamson's opera company in Australasia in 1915, starring Workman.

Film versions were made in 1921 (an American film) and in 1937 (a British film). The musical was adapted back into French by Mars and Desvallières and produced in Paris and then Lyon in 1913 as La chaste Suzanne. It was also staged in South America in Italian (La casta Susana) and in Spanish (La chasta Suzanna), among other languages.

== Synopsis ==
Pomarel totters drunkenly into the Jeunesse Dorée restaurant

In Paris, Baron Dauvray enters a taxi from one side, and Mme. Charcot simultaneously enters it from the other. They do not know each other, but agree to share the taxi. They are both on their way to the famous Jeunesse Dorée restaurant and enjoy each other's company so much that they agree to dine together. The restaurant is full of private rooms, ideal for intimate suppers. Others who come to the restaurant, mostly in pursuit of amatory enterprise, are the Baron's son Hubert; the Baron's daughter, Jacqueline; Réné, her fiancé and cousin; Suzanne Pomarel, wife of a provincial merchant, whom the Baron has awarded a prize for virtue; Mme Charcot's husband; and finally M. Pomarel.

Mme Pomarel is an old flame of Réné and has agreed to have supper with him, but Hubert, who is much smitten by her, has persuaded Réné to let him take his place. The Baron, dining with Mme Charcot, has to hide under his table to avoid his wife. Pomarel arrives, quite tipsy, and greets Hubert. He does not suspect that the lady who has concealed herself behind a curtain, and whose outstretched hand he kisses with bibulous gallantry, is his own wife. Hubert does not have sufficient funds to pay the bill. In the ensuing flurry, the Baron discovers to his delight that his son is as immoral as he. Everyone narrowly avoids detection by his or her proper partner.

Unfortunately for the errant men and women, the head waiter of the restaurant has been engaged as butler by Baroness Dauvray. All the main characters are present at breakfast at the Baron's house the next morning. They are horrified that the new butler knows everything about their escapades of the previous evening. In order to avoid being recognised by him, the Baron, Hubert and Réné all try to get under the table at the same time. In the end they manage to convince Pomarel that all the confusion was his fault for coming to the restaurant drunk. He apologises, and everyone is safe.

== Roles and original cast ==
Hubert and Suzanne react to Pomarel's unexpected arrival

- Baron Dauvray – Arthur Playfair
- Baroness Delphine Dauvray – Amy Augarde
- Jacqueline – Margaret Paton
- Hubert – Robert Averell
- Réné – Alec Fraser
- M. Pomarel – C. H. Workman
- Suzanne Pomarel – Yvonne Arnaud
- Professor Charcot – Louis Goodrich
- Rose Charcot – Cecily Stuckey
- Alexis (head waiter) – Frederick Volpe
- Waiter – George Carroll
- Diners, waiters, etc.

== Critical reception ==
Panic at the breakfast table

The Times took a dim view of the morality of the piece:

If your notion of Paris is the "gay" city (in the technical sense); if you like the kind of farce that takes you to a rowdy night-restaurant, where you find husbands and lovers, cocottes, girls and wives, mixed up in total confusion amid noise, paper streamers, and "penny teasers"; if you are amused by drunkenness; if you like to see an elderly member of the Forty a prude by day and a goat by night; his son receiving his "education" from a young married woman, and his daughter going with her betrothed to spy upon her father's escapades; if you like to see father and son dancing round together in delight at having found one another out; and if you like to enjoy all this rather heavily told, and spread, with catchy music, then The Girl in the Taxi is the very piece for you.

The paper thought much more highly of the farcical scenes in Act 3, "which gave us some of the 'knock-about' business which we hope to find funny till we die". The paper singled out the newcomer, Yvonne Arnaud, for special praise.

The Manchester Guardian expressed no moral qualms about the piece and thought the themes of the plot were handled tactfully and amusingly. It too singled out Arnaud for praise. It called the music "tuneful and scored with refinement, if not very original. There is a waltz of which (as the audience was whistling it before the play was half finished) we shall probably have a surfeit." The Academy thought the piece "gay, sportive and irresponsible … a delightful structure, an alluring entertainment".
