= Philip Michael Faraday =

British composer, lawyer and theatre producer

Philip Michael Faraday in 1921

Philip Michael Faraday (1 January 1875 – 6 February 1944) was an English lawyer, surveyor, composer, organist and theatrical producer. He composed one of the last Savoy operas, staged several long-running shows in the West End of London, and wrote a book about local taxation that was for many years the standard work on the subject. After sustaining financial losses on shows that he produced in the 1910s, Faraday declared bankruptcy in 1914. In later years he rebuilt his fortune through his legal and valuation work and resumed theatrical production.

== Early life ==
Faraday was born in Holloway, London, in 1875, one of five children born to Maria née Bragg (1837–1930) and Charles A. Faraday (1835–1913), a wholesale jeweller. It was a middle-class home with a cook and a nurse living with the family.

== Career ==
=== Early success ===
Faraday first came to public notice in his capacity as a lawyer and valuation expert. In 1896, at the age of 21, he published Rating: Principles, Practice, Procedure, a study of local property tax. This work became the standard book on its subject; there were three new editions in Faraday's lifetime and a further edition seven years after his death, revised by Sir Arthur Comyns Carr and others. Faraday published other papers early in his career. In 1900 he married Elizabeth Mary Gale (1872–1950) in Islington. The couple had at least three children: Stanley Michael (1902–1942), Yolande (1904–1965) and Thelma Faraday (born 1907).

=== Music and theatre ===
Alongside his work as a specialist in property valuation, Faraday began to compose songs and light operas. His songs include "Little princess, look up!" (1906), "Lovely woman" (1907), "I love somebody" (1910), "Jack the handy Man" (1910), "Maid o' mine" (1910) and "The Orphan Ward" (1910). With the librettist Frederick Fenn, he wrote Amāsis; or An Egyptian Princess, a comic opera that opened in August 1906 at the New Theatre. Fenn's libretto was rated above average, and The Times said of Faraday, "He has a sense of humour, and uses his orchestra ingeniously and artistically; his melodies are nearly always individual, sometimes extremely pleasant, and always well scored and supported." The English Illustrated Magazine wrote, "Mr. Faraday's work is admirable throughout, perhaps a trifle too reminiscent at times, and often very suggestive of Sir Arthur Sullivan's work in this field ... but it is imaginative and vigorous." The cast included two popular former stars of the Gilbert and Sullivan operas, Ruth Vincent and Rutland Barrington. It ran for 200 performances, transferring to the Criterion Theatre during the run. After it closed in London, the production was taken on tour.

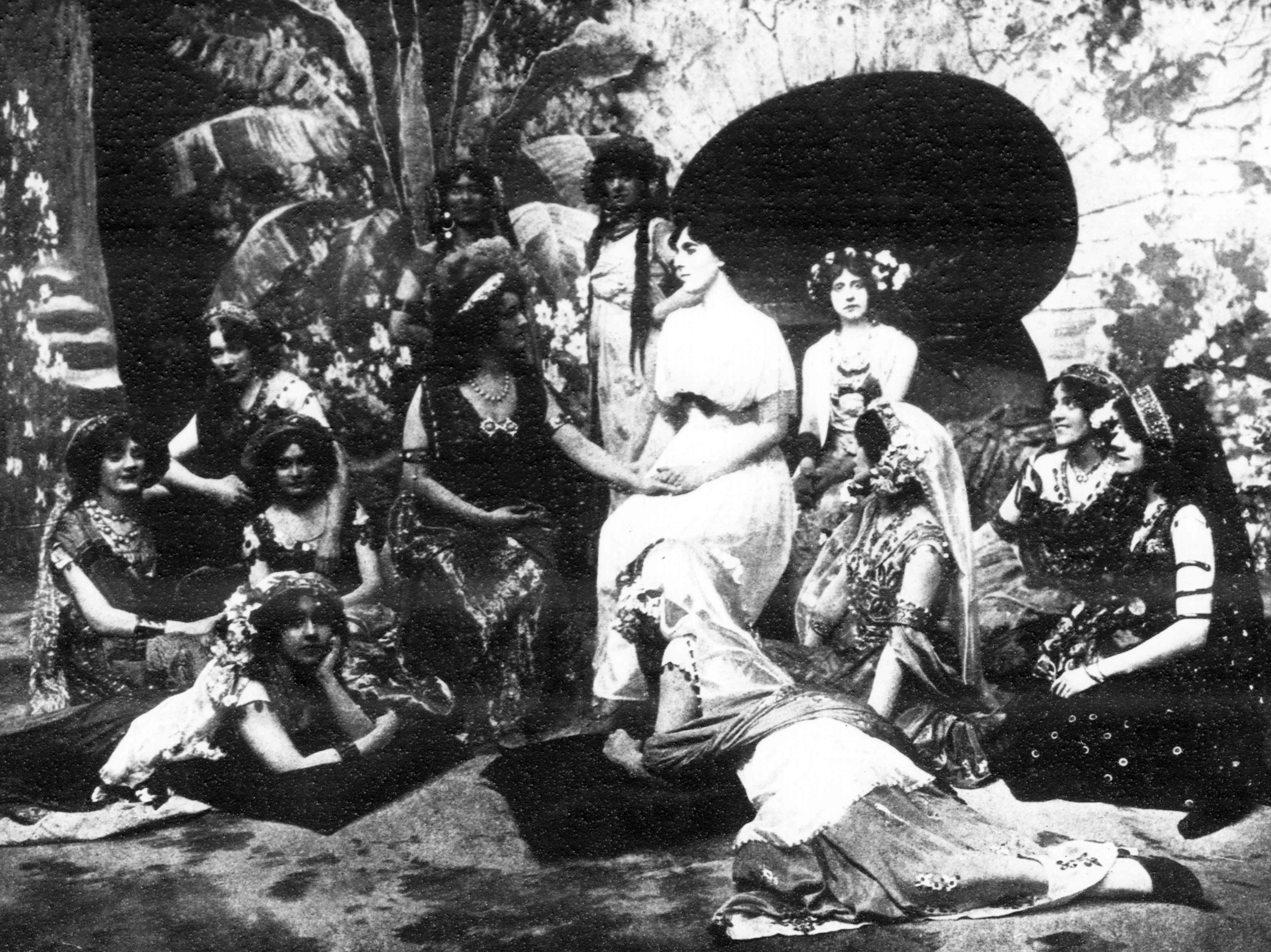
Scene from The Islander, 1910

Fenn and Faraday next collaborated on a one-act opera, A Welsh Sunset, described by The Times as "a sentimental, even a sickly little piece." Neither the libretto nor the score won critical approval. The piece was presented by the D'Oyly Carte Opera Company at the Savoy Theatre on 15 July 1908 as a curtain raiser to H.M.S. Pinafore and later to The Pirates of Penzance, for a total of 85 performances. Faraday's next stage piece was a musical comedy, The Islander, staged at the Apollo Theatre, with a libretto by Major Marshall. The music received some praise from reviewers, but Marshall's libretto was thought inferior to Fenn's work. The piece ran from 23 April to 6 August 1910. Another musical activity of Faraday's was as "Grand Organist of England" for the Freemasons, a position to which he was appointed in 1914. He was initiated into The Holloway Lodge No. 2601 in 1898.

As a producer, Faraday presented The Chocolate Soldier (1910), Nightbirds (1912), The Five Frankforters (described as a "Viennese banking comedy", 1912), The Girl in the Taxi (1912), The Girl Who Didn't (1913), and Mamzelle Tralala (1914), all at the Lyric Theatre. Faraday's other theatrical ventures of this period included a melodrama, Within the Law (1913), co-produced with Herbert Beerbohm Tree, and The Pink Lady (1912), a Broadway show, which he presented in the British provinces. Although The Chocolate Soldier and The Girl in the Taxi made large profits, other shows were produced at a loss. Faraday sold his interest in the Lyric and was declared bankrupt in August 1914. The bankruptcy was discharged in February 1915.

=== Later years ===
Faraday restored his fortunes by his successful work as an expert on rating and taxation. He became senior partner of Michael Faraday, Rodgers and Eller of Chancery Lane, London, acting for large corporations such as the Port of London Authority and the Durham Coal Owners' Association. By 1921 he was sufficiently recovered financially to resume his theatrical activities, presenting The Wrong Number, starring Yvonne Arnaud and CM Hallard, at the Duke of York's Theatre. The Play Pictorial described the play as a "farcical comedy, by Harriet Ford and Harvey O'Higgins, [which] is concocted with considerable ingenuity, and a theme, not over-strong in itself, is developed with sufficient plausibility to make it both amusing and fairly convincing".

In the same year, he became licensee of the Duke of York's. In 1922 he co-produced Sir Arthur Pinero's new play, The Enchanted Cottage, described by The Times as the most important theatrical event of the year. The play ran for only seven weeks, however, and Faraday gave up the tenancy of the theatre.

Faraday continued his activities as a property valuer, working as a specialist for, among other companies, Harrods into the 1930s. In 1939 he was living in Grosvenor Square in Mayfair, London, at one of two homes he owned in London, describing himself on the register as a "Rating Surveyor and diabetic requiring special food". At the same time his wife was at Aldeburgh in Suffolk with their son Stanley Michael Faraday, who was listed as "Incapacitated".

He died in George Street at his second home in London in 1944 at the age of 69. In his will he left £4,394 19s 6d.
