= Maggie (Wild musical) =

Musical Book

Maggie is a musical with book, music and lyrics by Michael Wild based on J.M. Barrie's play What Every Woman Knows.

After a premiere at the Forum Theatre in Billingham, the West End production opened at the Shaftesbury Theatre on 12 October 1977 and played for 42 performances. The West End production featured Anna Neagle, Peter Gale, and Anna Sharkey as Maggie. Sharkey received an Olivier Award for Best Performance in a Musical for the title role.
