= Richard Pryce =

English novelist and playwright

- Born: 14 May 1864; Boulogne, France
- Died: 30 May 1942 (aged 78); London, England
- Occupations: Novelist and playwright
- Years active: 1887 – 1918
- Notable work: David Penstephen

Richard Pryce (14 May 1864 – 30 May 1942) was an English novelist, author of Christopher, David Penstephen and other works of fiction. (Note: In 1913, the San Francisco Call announced: Four Books by the author of "Christopher" Are Published Simultaneously In This Country. The United States has been invaded by Richard Pryce through the medium of his novels, no less than four of which have been published simultaneously in this country. Up to the present time Mr. Pryce's reputation as far as America was concerned has rested upon a single moderately successful story, "Christopher." The best of the four novels recently issued may be expected to receive the same sort of limited recognition.) He was also a playwright and wrote a number of one act and three-act plays. Disappointed with his cold reception by the public in Britain, despite glowing reviews, he wrote very little after the outbreak of the First World War.

== Early life ==
Pryce was born in Boulogne, France on 14 May 1864. He was the second son of Colonel Price and Sarah Beatrice Hamilton (30 June 1834 – 7 April 1911). He was educated at Leamington in Warwickshire. He started life as a junior clerk in the Bank of England, before his first novel, An Evil Spirit was published in 1887.

== Novels ==
Jisc Library Hub Discover (Note: The Jisc Library Hub Discover brings together the catalogues of 165 Major UK and Irish libraries. Additional libraries are being added all the time, and the catalogue collates national, university, and research libraries.) lists 18 novels by Pryce. This list is not necessarily exhaustive.

Novels by Pryce
Ser.	Year	Title	Publisher	Pages	Notes
1	1887	An Evil Spirit	T. Fisher Unwin, London	2 v., 8º	(Note: Has a frontispiece by Henry Stephen Hal Ludlow (29 January 1859 – 19 August 1940), whom Houfe describes as a very competent all round magazine illustrator, his subjects ranging from theatrical sketches to Parliamentary reporting, stories and cattle shows)
2	1889	The Ugly Story of Miss Wetherby	Walter Scott, London	198 p.	(Note: The Pall Mall Gazette said that the book is . . . a bright tale of a clever imposture, which loses little by being quite impossible. The interest is well sustained, and the reader is kept in the dark for a very reasonable time. There is an online copy at the British Library.)
3	1890	Just impediment	Ward & Downey, London	2 v., 8º	(Note: There is an online copy at the British Library.)
4	1891	Deck-chair Stories	Ward & Downey, London	245 p., 8º	(Note: There is an online copy at the British Library.)
5	1891	The Quiet Mrs. Fleming	Methuen, London	258 p., 8º	(Note: There is an online copy at the British Library.)
6	1892	Miss Maxwell's affections : a novel	Chatto & Windus, London	2 v., 8º	(Note: There are online copies of both volumes at the British Library.. The British Library catalogue refers to an 1892 single volume edition by Chatto with a frontispiece by Henry Stephen Hal Ludlow.)
7	1892	Time and the woman	Methuen, London	2 v., 8º	(Note: There are an online copies of both volumes at the British Library.)
8	1894	Winifred Mount : a novel	Methuen, London	2 v., 8º	(Note: The British Library has online copies of both the 1894 two volume edition by Methuen, and the 1895 single edition by Innes & Co. The Athenæum said We should like to tell the plot of Mr. Pryce's delightful story, if only to show how skilfully it is put together.)
9	1895	The burden of a woman	A. D. Innes, London	315 p., 8º	(Note: There is an online copy at the British Library.)
10	1897	Elementary Jane	Hutchinson, London	[iv], 331 p., 8º	(Note: There is an online copy at the British Library.)
11	1900	Jezebel	Hutchinson, London	352 p., 8º	(Note: The Westminster Gazette said that: . . . there is a good deal of pleasant writing in it . . . but that the book is . . . a trifle long drawn out, and is inclined to tediousness in consequence. and that the book as a whole does not live up to the promise of graphic and dramatic writing in the first chapter.)
12	1904	The Successor	Hutchinson, London	332 p., 8º	(Note: This was the third edition)
13	1907	Towing-Path Bess, and other stories	Chapman & Hall, London	249 p., 8º	(Note: The Manchester Courier described this book as a collection of fifteen tales imbued with all the author's delightful qualities of dramatic characterisation and human sympathy. Most of the stories had already appeared in magazines. One of the stories The girl from Lambeth wad first appeared in ' Chapman's Magazine in 1896 and was subsequently dramatised by Pryce and Frederick Fenn as My Child.)
14	1911	Christopher	Hutchinson & Co, London	343 p., 8º	(Note: The novel follows the hero, Christopher Herrick from his birth aboard an ocean steamer on which his widowed mother is returning from India. The novel continues until early manhood, when Christopher's hopes of marrying an unsuitable wife are crushed.)
15	1916	David Penstephen	Methuen & Co, London	364 p., 8º	(Note: Sadlier says that this was widely read in the United States.)
16	1918	The Statue in the Wood	W. Collins Sons & Co, London	305 p., 8º	(Note: The Exeter and Plymouth Gazette said it was . . . a well told and thoroughly interesting story.)
17	1924	Romance and Jane Weston	W. Collins, London	291 p., 8º	(Note: Mr. Richard Pryce's sensitive art is not without a certain kinship with that of Miss Austen. His personages usually live in comfortable circumstances; their love attain and marriages are of the first importance. He excels in describing a charming drawing-room.)
18	1932	Morgan's yard	W. Collins, London	288 p., 8º	(Note: The Western Mail said I do not think that Mr. Richard Pryce has hurried over this story. He seems to linger lovingly over every word he has written. . . Mr. Pryce possesses a style which enfolds his subject with beauty and the thought which fills that beauty with light.)

== Plays ==
Jisc Library Hub Discover list ten plays by Pryce, or collections of plays. to which he contributed. Kemp notes that most of his plays were adaptations of the works of other authors. The following list is not exhaustive as at least one play by Pryce was found which was not listed in the catalogues collated by Jisc, and press references have been found to other plays.

Plays by Pryce, and collections of plays to which he contributed`.
Serial	Year	Title	Publisher	Pages	Notes
1	1904	'Op-o'-me-thumb : a play in one act	Samuel French, London	25 p., 8º	(Note: French's acting edition 2267. Written together with Frederick Fenn. The Bystander said that: "In its realism and combination of comedy and tragedy 'Op o' me Thumb' stands almost unrivalled." Served as a curtain raiser for Saturday to Monday at the St. James's Theatre)
2	1904	Saturday to Monday : an irresponsible comedy in three acts			(Note: Written together with Frederick Fenn. Opened at the St. James Theatre on 14 April 1904. 'Op 'o me Thumb served as a curtain raiser.. The play was still more than two months later when The Bystander did a six page photo-story on the play.)
3	1906	A privy council : a comedy in one act	Samuel French, London	34, 6 p., musical score, 8º	(Note: Written with playwright William Price Drury. French's acting edition no. 2302)
4	1907	The dumb-cake. A play in one act	Samuel French, London	12º	(Note: Adapted from a story in Arthur Morrison's "Divers vanities." French's acting edition no. 2318)
4	1910	Little Mrs. Cummin : a comedy in three acts	Samuel French, London	97, 1 p., 8º	(Note: This was adapted by Pryce from the novel The Eglamore Portraits (Methuen, London, 1906) by Mary E. Mann. French's acting edition 2359. The play was first performed on 1 December 1909 at the Playhouse. The London Evening Standard consider that while the play was distinctly jolly, it was not that funny. The plot centred on a mother-in-law secretly working against her son's wife.)
6	1910	The visit : a play in one act	Samuel French, London	24 p., 8º	(Note: This was an adaptation by Pryce of a story by Mary E. Mann called Freddy's Ship. French's acting edition no. 2356. The play was first performed on 1 December 1909 at the Playhouse, as a curtain raiser for Little Mrs Cummin. The London Evening Standard called the play a serious little play and was complimentary about the play and the actors. The one act-play concerned a woman trying to keep the news of the death of someone from his mother.)
7	1914	Helen with the high hand : a play in three acts	Samuel French, London	103, 5 p., 8º	(Note: This was an adaptation of the novel by Arnold Bennett. French's acting edition no. 2526. It was performed at the Vaudeville Theatre, London in 1914, with Mary Clare in the lead role.)
8	1920	The Old House			(Note: The play was not found in the Jisc catalogue (which includes the British Library catalogue). Adapted from the novel Candlelight by Alice Dudeney (Hurst and Blackett, London, 1918). Performed at the Royal Court Theatre, London in 1920.)
9	1924	One-act plays of to-day	Harrap, London		(Note: Selected by J. W. Marriott. It is not clear which of Pryce's one-act plays featured in this volume. This volume was obviously a success as Marriott edited the fourth series in 1928.)
10	1925	One-act plays of to-day : second series	Harrap, London		(Note: Selected by J. W. Marriott. It is not clear which of Pryce's one-act plays featured in this volume.)
11	1935	Frolic Wind. A play in three acts.	Victor Gollancz, London	127 p., 8º	(Note: Adapted from the novel by Richard Oke. Produced at the Royalty Theatre in 1935.)
12	1935	Famous plays of 1934-5	Victor Gollancz, London	695 p., 8º	(Note: This omnibus volume contained the following plays: Viceroy Sarah by N. Ginsbury' The Dominant Sex by M. Egan, Frolic Wind by Pryce, The Old Ladies by R. Ackland, Flowers of the Forest by J. van Druten, and Lovers' Leap by P. Johnson.)

== Later life ==
Pryce lived most of his life in the West End of London. He lived in one of the most quaint and miniature houses in London, fashioned out of a garage and two rooms which had been converted into five rooms and a bathroom. This was The Cottage, 4 Groom Place, Belgrave Square, London, where Pryce was still living at his death in 1928. His house was filled with finds from the Caledonian Market, to which Pryce made a visit every Friday morning.

Pryce died in the Royal Avenue Nursing Home in Chelsea, London, on 30 May 1942. His estate was valued at £2,500 14s. 1d.

== Assessment ==
Sadlier stated that, despite praise from reviewers, Pryce never had the success in Britain that he deserved. David Penstephen was widely read in the United States, but Pryce's self-assurance was shaken by the neglect he suffered at the hands of the British public.. He was much more popular in the United States and got many letters from readers there. Kemp says that Discouraged by the lack of public interest in his work, though reviews were warm, Pryce had more or less given up writing fiction by the outbreak of the First World War. However, the British Library catalogue contains works after this date. The Pall Mall Gazette said that Mr. Pryce's work is always highly finished, and very interesting on its technical side. He might almost be called "a writers’ writer."
