= Edith Waldemar Leverton =

English writer and editor (1868–1955)

- Born: Edith Annie Bedbrook; 21 April 1868; Portsea Island, England
- Died: 1955 (aged 87); Surrey, England
- Other name: E. Notrovel
- Occupations: Writer; editor
- Spouse: Frank John Waldemar Leverton (m. 1894; died 1897)
- Father: James Albert Bedbrook

Edith Waldemar Leverton (Note: Her surname is recorded as Waldemar Leverton, sometimes hyphenated as Waldemar-Leverton, and occasionally as Leverton. This article uses "Waldemar Leverton" for consistency.) (born Edith Annie Bedbrook; 21 April 1868 – 1955) was an English writer and editor. She contributed to magazines including The Lady's Realm and The Play Pictorial, and wrote books on household management, cookery, and dressmaking, including The Vegetarian Cookery Book (1903). She worked as sub-editor of The World of Dress, founded a theatre company called the Leverton Players, and wrote the play A Writer of Plays under the pseudonym E. Notrovel. She was secretary of the Women's Automobile and Sports Association and worked on infant and child welfare schemes in Glamorgan, Arundel, and Littlehampton.

== Biography ==
=== Early and personal life ===
Waldemar Leverton was born Edith Annie Bedbrook on Portsea Island on 21 April 1868. Her father was James Albert Bedbrook, Chief Inspector of Machinery for the Royal Navy.

She married Frank John Waldemar Leverton at St Luke's Church, Battersea, on 27 June 1894. He died in 1897. According to Robert Corfe, after being widowed she had financial difficulties but lived independently. Corfe described her as outgoing, self-assured, and assertive, and recalled her riding a tricycle around Littlehampton, where she lived.

=== Career ===
==== Writing ====
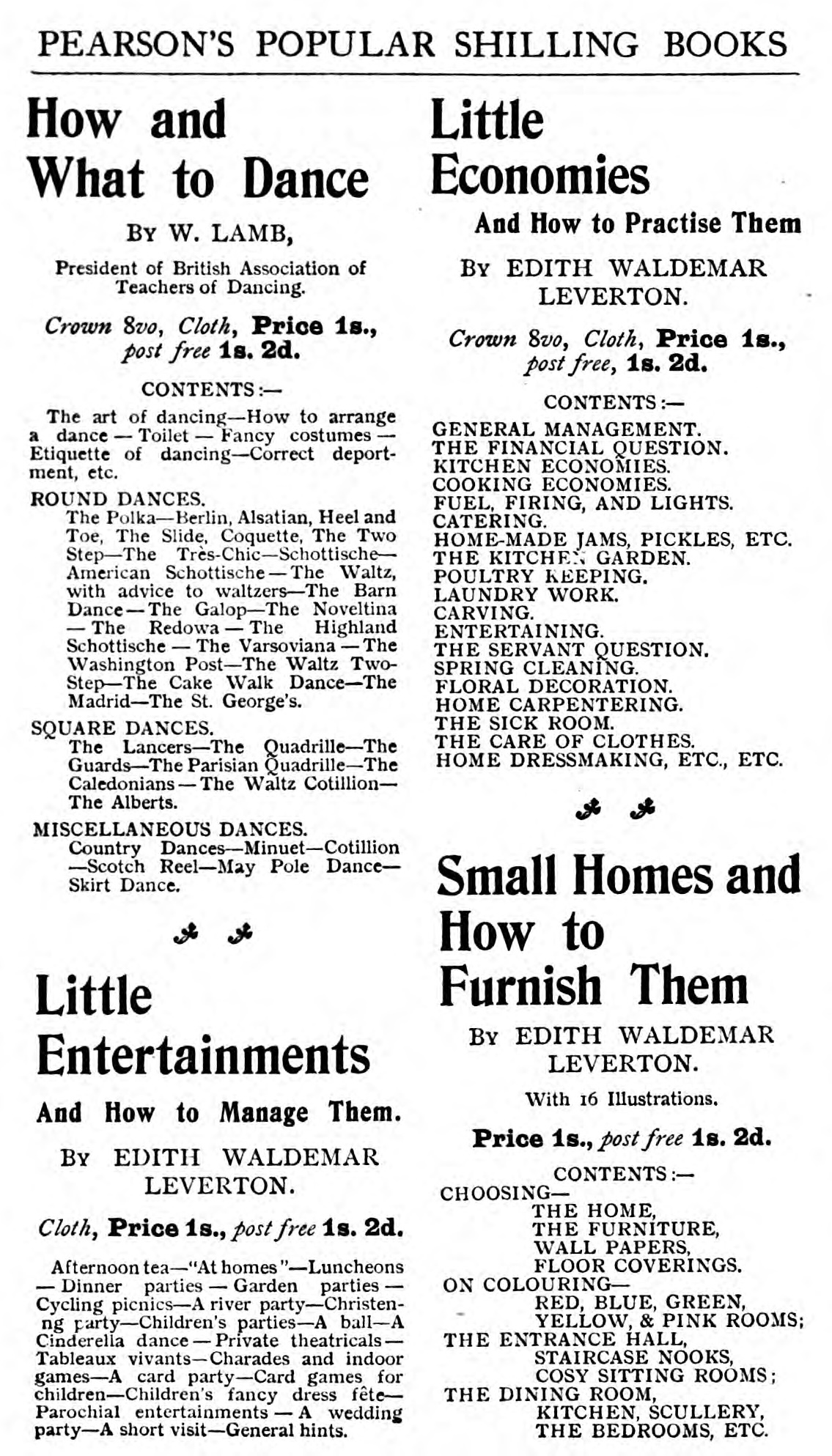
Advertisement for Pearson's Popular Shilling Books, including works by Waldemar Leverton, 1904

Waldemar Leverton wrote for magazines including The Lady's Realm and The Play Pictorial. Her books included Household Hints, The Vegetarian Cookery Book, Little Economies and How to Practice Them, and Servants and Their Duties.

==== Editing ====
Waldemar Leverton was sub-editor of The World of Dress, later continued as The World of Dress and Women's Journal.

==== Theatre work ====
Waldemar Leverton presented the theatre company known as the Leverton Players in a series of performances, beginning with a three-week season at the Royal Court Theatre in 1913. She wrote the play A Writer of Plays under the pseudonym E. Notrovel.

She appeared in productions including Fantasy and Flame, as Mrs. Wayre; Mirage of Misfortune, as Mrs. Braithwaite; The Stranger at the Inn, as Mrs. Cherry; and The Castle of Fate, as Cattiva.

In 1939, Waldemar Leverton wrote and produced A Song of Sixpence, a "nonsense" play performed by the Little Marlow and Bourne End Women's Institute in aid of the Little Marlow Nursing Association.

==== Other activities ====
Waldemar Leverton was secretary of the Women's Automobile and Sports Association. She was also a member of the Society of Women Journalists.

Waldemar Leverton introduced the Association of Infant Consultations and Schools for Mothers in Glamorgan, South Wales, as part of the infant welfare department of the National League for Physical Education and Improvement. She also worked with the Duchess of Norfolk in Arundel and Littlehampton on the establishment of child welfare centres.

=== Death ===
Waldemar Leverton died aged 87 in Surrey during the third quarter of 1955.

== Publications ==
- Household Hints (edited by "Isobel"; London: C. Arthur Pearson, 1897)
- The Vegetarian Cookery Book (London: G. Newnes, 1903)
- Little Economies and How to Practice Them (edited by "Isobel"; London: C. Arthur Pearson, 1903)
- Little Entertainments and How to Manage Them (edited by "Isobel"; London: C. Arthur Pearson, 1904)
- Dressmaking Made Easy (London: G. Newnes, 1909)
- Housekeeping Made Easy (London: G. Newnes, 1910)
- Servants and Their Duties (London: C. Arthur Pearson, 1912)

== See also ==
- History of vegetarianism
- Women and vegetarianism and veganism advocacy
- Women in the Victorian era
- Vegetarianism in the United Kingdom
- Vegetarianism in the Victorian era
