= Frederick Fenn =

English playwright and journalist (1868–1924)

Frederick Fenn (6 November 1868 – 2 January 1924) was an English playwright, journalist and drama critic. He was the librettist for one of the last Savoy Operas, A Welsh Sunset (1908), and had his greatest success with the musical comedy The Girl in the Taxi (1912).

== Life and career ==
Fenn was born in Bishop's Stortford, Hertfordshire, a son of the novelist George Manville Fenn and his wife Susanna, née Leake; he was educated privately. His early works included Judged by Appearances, a one-act play, produced at the Comedy Theatre, London in 1902. Another one-act piece, The Honourable Ghost, was played on tour as a curtain raiser to The Bishop's Move, 1902. During the next four years Fenn had three more full-length plays staged: A Married Woman (1902), The Age of Innocence (1904) and The Convict on the Hearth (1906).

The Times considered Fenn's 1904 one-act play 'Op o' Me Thumb his best. In the West End, Hilda Trevelyan had a great success in the leading role, and Fenn adapted it for the cinema in 1920 under the title Suds, a film that starred Mary Pickford. Of Fenn's later plays, the one that made most impression was The Girl in the Taxi (1912), a collaboration with Arthur Wimperis (libretto) and Jean Gilbert (music), an adaptation of a German piece, Die keusche Susanne (1910), which was based on Antony Mars and Maurice Desvallières's play, Le Fils à papa (1906). Starring Yvonne Arnaud, Arthur Playfair and C. H. Workman, it ran at the Lyric Theatre, London for 385 performances.

In 1906 Fenn collaborated as librettist with the composer Philip Michael Faraday on the comic opera Amisis, produced at the New Theatre. The two worked together again on one of the last Savoy Operas, A Welsh Sunset, which was produced by the D'Oyly Carte Opera Company and ran at the Savoy Theatre for 85 performances in 1908.

Fenn was for many years assistant editor of The Graphic and dramatic critic of The Daily Graphic. He died in the London suburb Isleworth, on 2 January 1924, aged 57.

== References and sources ==
=== Sources ===
- Parker, John, ed. (1922). Who's Who in the Theatre (fourth ed.). London: Sir Isaac Pitman and Sons. OCLC 473894893.
