= What Every Woman Knows (1921 film) =

1921 film

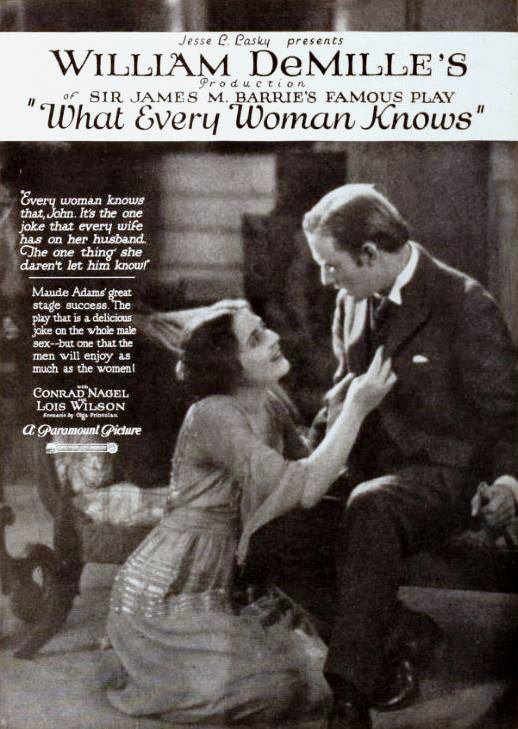
- Advertisement
- Directed by: William C. deMille
- Written by: Olga Printzlau (scenario)
- Based on: What Every Woman Knows; 1908 play by James Barrie
- Produced by: Adolph Zukor; Jesse Lasky
- Starring: Lois Wilson; Conrad Nagel
- Cinematography: L. Guy Wilky
- Distributed by: Paramount Pictures
- Release date: April 24, 1921
- Running time: 7 reels, 6,772 feet
- Country: United States
- Language: Silent (English intertitles)

What Every Woman Knows is a 1921 American silent comedy-drama film adapted from the play What Every Woman Knows by James Barrie. The play had premiered on Broadway in 1908 and was a hit starring Maude Adams. A British silent film version had been made in 1917 and a later American talkie would be produced in 1934 with Helen Hayes. This silent film version was directed by William C. deMille continuing his forte at adapting literary and/or stage plays to the silent screen. The film stars Lois Wilson and Conrad Nagel. This version is now lost.

== Plot ==
Based on a summary in a film publication, Maggie Wylie's father agrees to give John Shand $300 to help him secure his education and political ambitions on condition that Maggie have the option of marrying him within five years. By doing so the elder Wylie is giving the 27-year-old miss the chance for the romance she longs for and at the same time helping an ambitious young man. Shand agrees and within the allotted time is elected to Parliament. Maggie realizes that John does not love her, but he insists "a bargain is a bargain" and so they are married. John becomes very popular and is promised promotion through his excellent speeches, which are written mostly by Maggie although John takes credit. Eventually, he falls in love with Lady Sybil and, although heartbroken, Maggie diplomatically arranges for John and Sybil to be together. John's next speech is a failure, but Maggie arrives in time with a new one. Lady Sybil tells John that he bores her and leaves. Gradually John comes to see Maggie's true worth and there is a reconciliation.

== Cast ==
- Lois Wilson as Maggie Wylie
- Conrad Nagel as John Shand
- Charles Ogle as Alick Wylie
- Fred Huntley as David Wylie
- Guy Oliver as James Wylie
- Winter Hall as Charles Venables
- Lillian Tucker as Sybil Tenterden
- Claire McDowell as Comtesse de la Briere
- Robert Brower as Scot Lawyer
