= James Albert Bedbrook =

English naval engineer (1845–1902)

Engineer Rear-Admiral James Albert Bedbrook
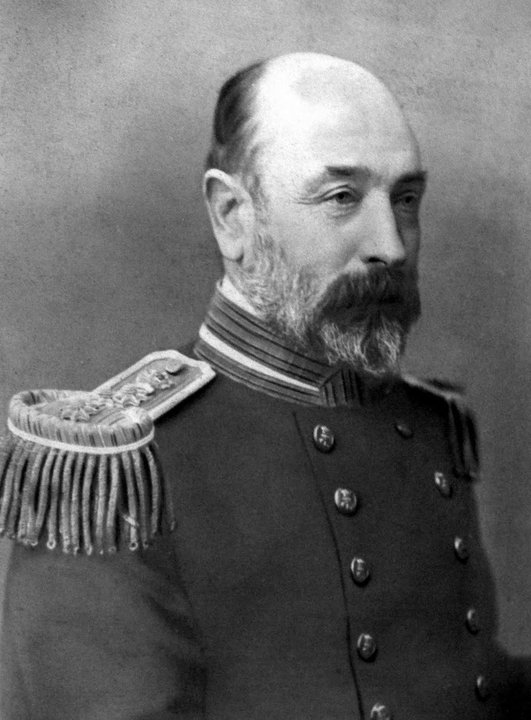
- Rear Admiral James Albert Bedbrook R.N.
- Born: 1845; Portsea, Hampshire, England
- Died: 1902 (aged 56–57)
- Occupation: Naval engineer
- Spouse: Matilda Ann Crocker
- Children: 10, including Edith

James Albert Bedbrook (1845–1902) was an English naval engineer.

== Early and personal life ==
James Albert Bedbrook was born in Portsea, Hampshire, to James Albert Bedbrook and Elizabeth Sarah Cammell.

He was married to Matilda Ann Crocker and they had ten children, including Major Ernest Arthur St George Bedbrook and Edith Waldemar Leverton. He was stationed in Devon, Hampshire, Kent and Malta and the family later lived in Haresfield House, Blenkarne Road, Wandsworth Common, London.

== Naval life ==
Bedbrook entered the service in 1859, as an engineer student working in Portsmouth dockyard. He attended the Royal School of Naval Architecture in South Kensington and in 1867, was commissioned as assistant engineer on board HMS Warrior for sea service.

Bedbrook went on to serve on HMS Trafalgar in 1870, touring through the Mediterranean. In 1871, he was appointed to Keyham Yard, as engineer officer. He spent 15 years stationed at Chatham Yard, Kent, as assistant to the chief engineer and then as chief engineer himself. He was soon promoted to the rank of inspector of machinery and spent time in Malta with the Mediterranean fleet.

In 1898, Bedbrook was appointed as professional assistant to Sir John Durston, part of the Controller's Department at the Admiralty. At this time, steam pressures over 150 lb. in naval ships was rare and the tendency was to subject the boilers to a high degree of forced draught to get all the power, with leaky tubes becoming a source of trouble. The French type of Belleville boiler was introduced, practically doubling the steam pressure. Subsequently, other types were adopted, and the Belleville boiler was dispensed with.

James Bedbrook's rise through the service is as follows;

- 1867: Assistant Engineer
- 1869: Engineer
- 1877: Chief Engineer
- 1886: Fleet Engineer
- 1889: Inspector of Machinery
- 1894: Chief Inspector of Machinery

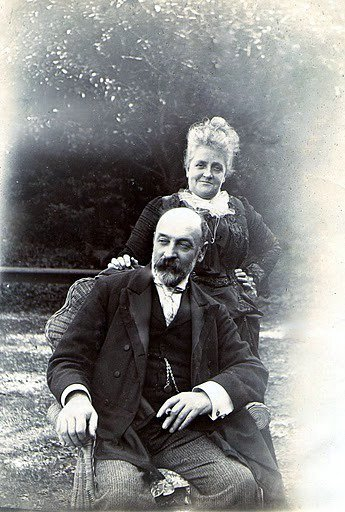
James and Matilda Bedbrook

Whilst serving in the Royal Navy, Bedbrook argued for better working conditions for his men, higher salaries and better social inclusion for the engineer ranks. His greatest role to posterity in regard to his career in the Royal Navy is his success in obtaining military rank (or titles) for engineers and technicians within the service as opposed to the civilian titles they previously held.

== Death ==
Bedbrook retired in 1901 and the following year, aged 57, he died from the result of a serious operation, due to appendicitis. He was interred in West Norwood Cemetery.
