= What Every Woman Knows (play) =

1908 play by J. M. Barrie

Original British production at the Duke of York's Theatre, 1908

What Every Woman Knows is a four-act play written by J. M. Barrie. It was first presented by impresario Charles Frohman at the Duke of York's Theatre in London on 3 September 1908. It ran for 384 performances, transferring to the Hicks Theatre between 21 December 1908 and 15 February 1909.

The play was first produced in America, also by Frohman, in 1908 at Atlantic City on 18 October 1908, transferring to Broadway, at the Empire Theatre in New York City in December 1908. The production starred Maude Adams and Richard Bennett.

Written before women's suffrage, the play posits that "every woman knows" she is the invisible power responsible for the successes of the men in her life.

== 1908 casts ==
London

- John Shand – Gerald du Maurier
- Alick Wylie – Henry Vibart
- David Wylie – Sydney Valentine
- James Wylie – Edmund Gwenn
- Maggie Wylie – Hilda Trevelyan
- Charles Venables – Norman Forbes (aka Norman Forbes-Robertson)
- Comtesse de la Briere – Mrs. Tree
- Lady Sybil Lazenby – Lillah McCarthy
- Maid – Madge Murray

Atlantic City and New York

- John Shand – Richard Bennett
- Alick Wylie – R. Payton Carter
- David Wylie – David Torrence
- James Wylie – Fred Tyler
- Maggie Wylie – Maude Adams
- Charles Venables – Lumsden Hare
- Comtesse de la Briere – Ffolliott Paget
- Lady Sybil Lazenby – Beatrice Agnew
- Maid – Lillian Spencer
- First Elector – James L. Carhart
- Second Elector – Wallace Jackson
- Third Elector – W. H. Gilmore

== Synopsis ==
The Wylies, a well-to-do but uneducated Scottish family, are concerned about their daughter, Maggie, a plain young woman who they fear will remain a spinster. One night the Wylies discover that a serious young university student, John Shand, has been breaking into their home so that he can read books from their large library. Shand is penniless and cannot afford to buy books for his law school education. Maggie Wylie and John Shand come to an understanding: that her family will fund his education if, at the end of five years, he agrees to marry her.

John honours his commitment to Maggie, marrying her although he does not love her. Recognising her husband's ambition to become a Member of Parliament, Maggie quietly uses her intelligence and her connections behind the scenes to get John elected. She continues to foster his career, never allowing him to see that she is the power behind his rise to fame.

Eventually John begins to believe that his wife is too plain for a man of his stature and position, and he takes up with Lady Sybil Lazenby, a beautiful, refined and high-born young Englishwoman. Maggie is prepared to let her husband go, if Sybil can help him more than she herself can. However, when Shand is preparing a speech that will make or break his career, he finds that Sybil is no help to him, and he realises that Maggie is his inspiration.

== Performance history ==
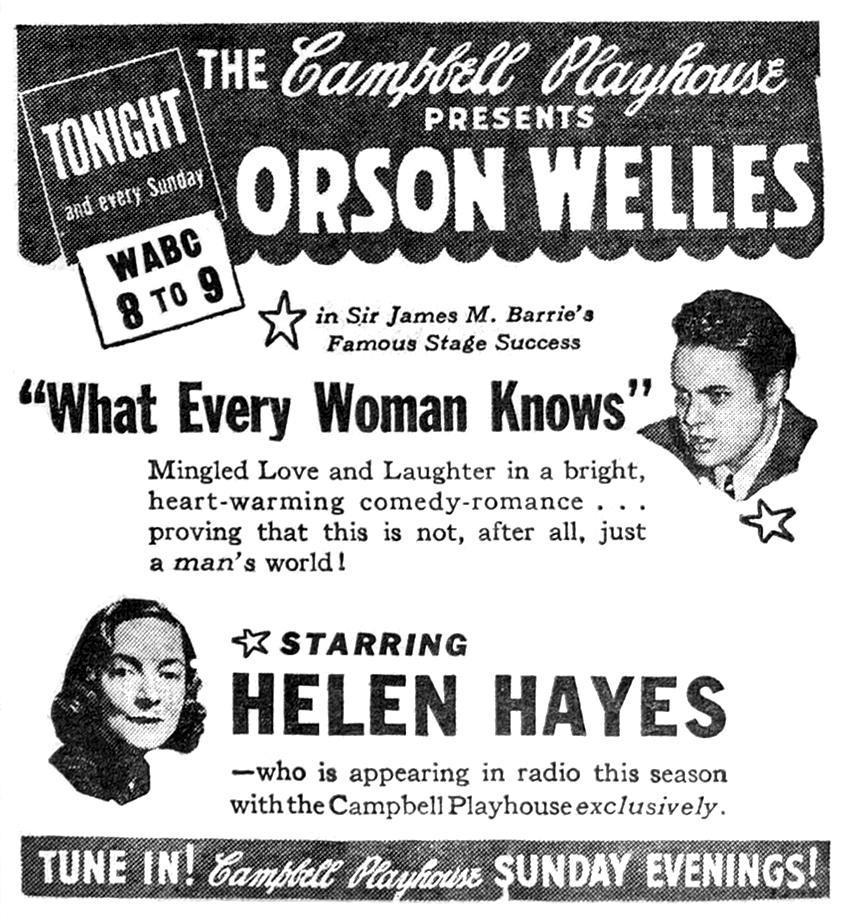
Helen Hayes reprised her stage and screen success on CBS Radio's The Campbell Playhouse (1939)

What Every Woman Knows was popular on Broadway, enjoying 198 performances during its first run. Helen Hayes starred in the 1926 Broadway revival, which ran 268 performances.

A British silent film version was made in 1917 and an American silent film was produced in 1921. The play was later adapted into a 1934 film starring Helen Hayes and Brian Aherne.

The play has been revived numerous times since throughout the English-speaking world, including productions at the Gateway Theatre in Edinburgh in 1953, at the Old Vic in 1960, with Maggie Smith as Maggie and Donald Houston as John, and the Albery Theatre in 1974, with Dorothy Tutin and Peter Egan.

What Every Woman Knows starring Helen Hayes was the opening production of the Huntington Hartford Theater in 1954. The Hartford was Los Angeles's prime venue for Broadway-scale productions the next ten years.

The play's most recent London revival was at the Finborough Theatre in 2010. In 1976 in New York, Fran Brill was awarded the Drama Desk Award for her portrayal of Maggie Wylie. In 1977 there was a musical version entitled Maggie at the Shaftesbury Theatre in London.

Noel and Company presented a staged reading of the play at the Mint Theater in New York City in 2013, directed by David Glenn Armstrong and produced by Anne Kaufman. The cast included Carole Shelley, Aedin Maloney, Robert Sella, Heidi Armbruster, Kevin Collins, Alex Rice and John Windsor-Cunningham.

BBC Radio 4 broadcast an audio adaptation in October 1983, starring Phyllis Logan and David Hayman. The recording was thought lost but was later returned to the BBC and broadcast again on BBC Radio 4 Extra in March 2024 as part of strand called "Hidden Treasures".
