= Hilda Trevelyan =

British actress (1877–1959)

As Maggie Wylie in Barrie's What Every Woman Knows, 1908

Hilda Trevelyan (4 February 1877 – 10 November 1959) was an English actress. Early in her career she became known for her performance in plays by J. M. Barrie, and is probably best remembered for creating the role of Wendy in Peter Pan.

Another early success was as Oliver Twist in a dramatisation of Charles Dickens's novel staged by Herbert Beerbohm Tree. Later in her career she performed in plays by Arnold Bennett, Ian Hay and others, in London and on tour. She retired after her last London play in 1939.

== Life and career ==
=== Early years ===
Trevelyan was born Hilda Marie Antoinette Anna Tucker, in Hackney, London, daughter of John Joseph Tucker, a farmer, and his French wife, Helene Adolphine Marie Foulon. She was educated at the Ursuline convent in Upton. She first appeared on stage at the age of twelve in a production of The Silver King, a melodrama by Henry Arthur Jones and Henry Herman. By the age of sixteen she was touring in the musical comedy A Gaiety Girl. Her first important London engagement was at the Court Theatre in 1898, understudying Pattie Browne in the role of Avonia Bunn in Trelawny of the 'Wells', a part that she later played many times in her own right.

Early in her career she attracted the attention of James Barrie. She toured as Lady Babbie in his romance The Little Minister, playing the part more than 700 times. She returned to London and appeared in two conspicuous successes, A Chinese Honeymoon (taking over from Louie Freear as Fi Fi) and 'Op o' Me Thumb, as Amanda. In 1904 she resumed her association with Barrie, touring in his Little Mary. He was working on the stage version of Peter Pan at the time, and he cast her as Wendy to the Peter of Nina Boucicault. Over the years she played the part nearly a thousand times.

In Barrie's Alice Sit-by-the-Fire (1905) she had a supporting role in the London cast, in which the main female roles were taken by Ellen Terry and Irene Vanbrugh as mother and daughter. When the piece toured, Terry remained and Trevelyan succeeded to Vanbrugh's part. She followed this comic role with "an exquisite performance as the hapless, terror-stricken orphan" in Herbert Beerbohm Tree's production of Oliver Twist.

=== West End success ===
After playing Tweeny in a revival of Barrie's The Admirable Crichton in 1908, Trevelyan was given her biggest chance so far, as Maggie in What Every Woman Knows, a part Barrie wrote with her in mind. She made a great success in the role; The Observer wrote of her "quite triumphant attainment of the art which art conceals … the audience received this quaintest of comedies with rapturous relish throughout." The Times said that Trevelyan was "the darling, the acclaimed idol of a house excited to the highest pitch of enthusiasm." A silent film of the piece was later made, with Trevelyan the only member of the original cast.

In 1910 Trevelyan married a fellow-actor, and writer, Sydney Blow (1878–1961). After the success of What Every Woman Knows, she went into management for a time, in partnership with Edmund Gwenn. In 1916 she had another Barrie hit with A Kiss for Cinderella.

=== Post-war and later years ===
In 1924 Trevelyan appeared in a new production of Arnold Bennett's The Great Adventure. The Observer's critic wrote, "When I say that Miss Hilda Trevelyan's Janet Cannot seemed to me quite perfect there will doubtless be people to tell me that the part has been done better. But I don't think I shall believe them." In 1926 she took over from Mary Jerrold in a revival of Barrie's Mary Rose.

One of the most notable of Trevelyan's performances in the 1930s was with Nina Boucicault in a BBC radio broadcast called There's More Magic in the Air, in which they played their original roles of nearly thirty years earlier, in a "composite fantasy" in which Peter Pan and Wendy mingled with Prospero and Ariel. The Manchester Guardian reported that their voices were wonderfully clear and young. One of the great successes of the last years of Trevelyan's career was Ian Hay's Housemaster, in which she played Barbara Fane. The play ran for 662 performances from November 1936.

Trevelyan also appeared in several films in the silent and sound era, her most notable (but uncredited) role being in Alfred Hitchcock's The 39 Steps as a innkeeper's wife in the Scottish countryside that allows Richard Hannay (Robert Donat) and Pamela (Madeleine Carroll) to stay in her inn overnight while on the run.

After appearing in a revival of Michael Barringer's comedy-thriller Inquest in 1939 Trevelyan retired. She and her husband, who outlived her, enjoyed twenty years of retirement at their country house near Henley-on-Thames. There were no children of the marriage. She died at Henley-on-Thames, at the age of 82.

== Filmography ==
- Sally in Our Alley (1916)
- What Every Woman Knows (1917)
- Colonel Blood (1934)
- The 39 Steps (1935)
- The Tunnel (1935)
- Inquest (TV film) (1939)
