= The Play Pictorial =

- Cover of The Play Pictorial, vol. 7, no. 45, 1906
- Frequency: Monthly
- First issue: April 1902
- Final issue Number: September 1939; 446
- Company: Greening & Co
- Country: UK
- Based in: London
- Language: English
- ISSN: 2043-5673

The Play Pictorial was an English theatrical magazine that was published in London between 1902 and 1939.

The Play Pictorial provided pictorial records of West End theatrical productions. Each issue described a single show, with descriptions of the plot, the costumes and the sets, and many photographs of the cast and scenes from the production. For musicals, The Play Pictorial usually included some of the lyrics and short extracts from the score.

The first editor of The Play Pictorial was Rudolph Birnbaum. In May 1904, he was replaced by Frank M. Boyd. In 1905, Fred Dangerfield became editor, handling the next 20 issues.

In 1905, The Play Pictorial merged with a rival magazine, The Play, which had been published between May and October 1904 under the editorship of Benjamin William Findon. In mid-1906, Findon took over the combined magazine, which he continued to edit for over 30 years.

The last issue of The Play Pictorial, no. 446, appeared in 1939. The magazine was absorbed into another London theatrical magazine, Theatre World.
