= Cultural impact of Gilbert and Sullivan =

Discussion of cultural impacts

For nearly 150 years, Gilbert and Sullivan have pervasively influenced popular culture in the English-speaking world. Lines and quotations from the Gilbert and Sullivan operas have become part of the English language, such as "short, sharp shock", "What never? Well, hardly ever!", "let the punishment fit the crime", and "A policeman's lot is not a happy one".

The Savoy operas heavily influenced the course of the development of modern musical theatre. They have also influenced political style and discourse, literature, film and television and advertising, and have been widely parodied by humorists. Because they are well-known and convey a distinct sense of Britishness (or even Victorian Britishness), and because they are in the public domain, songs from the operas appear "in the background" in many movies and television shows.

The operas have so pervaded Western culture that events from the "lives" of their characters from the operas are memorialized by major news outlets. For instance, a 29 February 1940 article in The New York Times noted that Frederic, from The Pirates of Penzance, was finally out of his indentures (having reached his 21st birthday, as described in that opera).

== Musical theatre and comedy ==
The American and British musical owes a tremendous debt to Gilbert and Sullivan, who introduced innovations in content and form that directly influenced the development of musical theatre through the 20th century. According to theatre writer John Bush Jones, Gilbert and Sullivan were "the primary progenitors of the twentieth century American musical" in which book, music and lyrics combine to form an integrated whole, and they demonstrated "that musicals can address contemporary social and political issues without sacrificing entertainment value".

Gilbert's complex rhyme schemes and satirical lyrics served as a model for Edwardian musical comedy writers such as Adrian Ross and Owen Hall, and for such 20th century Broadway lyricists as P. G. Wodehouse, Cole Porter, Ira Gershwin, Yip Harburg, Lorenz Hart, Oscar Hammerstein II and Sheldon Harnick. Even some of the plot elements from G&S operas entered subsequent musicals; for example, 1937's Me and My Girl features a portrait gallery of ancestors that, like the portraits in Ruddigore, come alive to remind their descendant of his duty. Johnny Mercer said, "We all come from Gilbert." Alan Jay Lerner wrote that Gilbert "raised lyric writing from a serviceable craft to a legitimate popular art form", and, despite professing not to be a Gilbert fan, Stephen Sondheim wrote "Please Hello" for Pacific Overtures (1976), a song that has been called "an homage" to Gilbert. Yip Harburg said, "Perhaps my first great literary idol was W. S. Gilbert. ... Gilbert's satirical quality entranced us [Harburg and Ira Gershwin] – his use of rhyme and meter, his light touch, the marvelous way his words blended with Sullivan's music. A revelation!" In the number "Right Hand Man" from the 2015 musical Hamilton by Lin-Manuel Miranda, George Washington refers to himself with irony as "The model of a modern major general", which he rhymes with "men are all" and "pedestal". Miranda commented: "I always felt like 'mineral' wasn't the best possible rhyme."

Sullivan was also admired and copied by early composers such as Ivan Caryll, Lionel Monckton, Victor Herbert, George Gershwin, Jerome Kern, Ivor Novello, and Andrew Lloyd Webber. Noël Coward wrote:

I was born into a generation that still took light music seriously. The lyrics and melodies of Gilbert and Sullivan were hummed and strummed into my consciousness at an early age. My father sang them, my mother played them, my nurse, Emma, breathed them through her teeth while she was washing me, dressing me and undressing me and putting me to bed. My aunts and uncles, who were legion, sang them singly and in unison at the slightest provocation....

— Introduction to The Noël Coward Song Book

According to theatre historian John Kenrick, H.M.S. Pinafore, in particular, "became an international sensation, reshaping the commercial theater in both England and the United States." Adaptations of The Mikado, Pinafore and The Gondoliers have played on Broadway or the West End, including The Hot Mikado (1939; Hot Mikado played in the West End in 1995), George S. Kaufman's 1945 Hollywood Pinafore, the 1975 animated film Dick Deadeye, or Duty Done and, more recently,Gondoliers (2001; a Mafia-themed adaptation) and Pinafore Swing (2004), the last two of which were first produced at the Watermill Theatre, in which the actors also served as the orchestra, playing the musical instruments. Looser adaptations include Memphis Bound (1945). Shows that use G&S songs to tell the story of the Gilbert and Sullivan partnership include a 1938 Broadway show, Knights of Song, and a 1975 West End show called Tarantara! Tarantara!, Sullivan and Gilbert (1982) and The Savoyards by Donald Madgwick (1971). The play Dr Sullivan and Mr Gilbert fictionalises the Gilbert and Sullivan partnership. Many other musicals parody or pastiche the operas.

However, the influence of Gilbert and Sullivan goes beyond musical theatre to comedy in general. Professor Carolyn Williams notes: "The influence of Gilbert and Sullivan – their wit and sense of irony, the send ups of politics and contemporary culture – goes beyond musical theater to comedy in general. Allusions to their work have made their way into our own popular culture". According to Gilbert and Sullivan expert and enthusiast Ian Bradley:

The musical is not, of course, the only cultural form to show the influence of G&S. Even more direct heirs are those witty and satirical songwriters found on both sides of the Atlantic in the twentieth century like Michael Flanders and Donald Swann in the United Kingdom and Tom Lehrer in the United States. The influence of Gilbert is discernible in a vein of British comedy that runs through John Betjeman's verse via Monty Python and Private Eye to... television series like Yes Minister... where the emphasis is on wit, irony, and poking fun at the establishment from within it in a way which manages to be both disrespectful of authority and yet cosily comfortable and urbane.

— Oh Joy! Oh Rapture! The Enduring Phenomenon of Gilbert and Sullivan

== Effect on amateur theatre ==
Cellier and Bridgeman wrote, in 1914, that prior to the creation of the Savoy operas, amateur actors were treated with contempt by professionals. After the formation of amateur Gilbert and Sullivan troupes in the 1880s licensed to perform the operas, professionals recognised that the amateur groups "support the culture of music and the drama. They are now accepted as useful training schools for the legitimate stage, and from the volunteer ranks have sprung many present-day favourites." Cellier and Bridgeman attributed the rise in quality and reputation of the amateur groups largely to "the popularity of, and infectious craze for performing, the Gilbert and Sullivan operas". The National Operatic and Dramatic Association was founded in 1899. It reported, in 1914, that nearly 200 British amateur troupes were producing Gilbert and Sullivan operas that year. There continue to be hundreds of amateur groups or societies performing the Gilbert and Sullivan works worldwide.

== Politics, government, and law ==
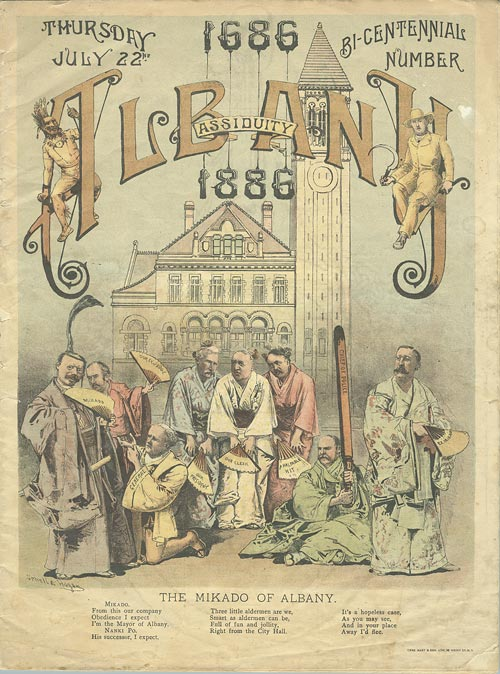
Political parody celebrating the bicentennial of Albany, New York

The phrase "A short, sharp shock", from the Act I song "I am so proud" in The Mikado, has been used in political manifestos. Likewise, "Let the punishment fit the crime", from the title character's Act II song, is particularly mentioned in the course of British political debates. Political humour based on Gilbert and Sullivan's style and characters continues into the 21st century. For example, in 1996, Virginia Bottomley, heritage secretary under John Major, sent up Tony Blair in a parody of "When I Was a Lad" from Pinafore. In October 2010, Ron Butler released a YouTube video pastiche of the "Major-General's Song" in character as, and mildly lampooning, President Obama.

Lawyers have noted the Gilbert and Sullivan because so much of it spoofs the law, lawyers, government and their foibles. US Supreme Court Justice William Rehnquist, a lifelong fan of Gilbert and Sullivan, quoted lyrics from the operas in law cases, parodied the lyrics in his writings at the Court and added gold stripes to his judicial robes after seeing them used by the Lord Chancellor in a production of Iolanthe. The Lord Chancellor Lord Falconer, on the other side of the Atlantic, objected so strongly to Iolanthe's comic portrayal of Lord Chancellors (like himself) that he supported moves to disband the office. British politicians, beyond quoting some of the more famous lines, have also delivered speeches in the form of Gilbert and Sullivan parodies. These include Conservative Peter Lilley's pastiche of "I've got a little list" from The Mikado, listing those he was against, including "sponging socialists" and "young ladies who get pregnant just to jump the housing queue". Other government references to Gilbert and Sullivan include postage stamps issued to memorialize the operas and various other uses by government entities. For instance, the arms granted to the municipal borough of Penzance in 1934 contain a pirate dressed in Gilbert's original costuming.

21st century press mentions of Gilbert and Sullivan songs include a 2010 parody version of the "Major-General's Song" was posted as an op-ed piece in the Richmond Times-Dispatch mocking actions of the Attorney General of Virginia, Ken Cuccinelli. A 2024 piece in The New Republic quoted the "little list" song from The Mikado and compared Ko-Ko's little list to Kash Patel's threats to use the F.B.I. and other U.S. government resources to "persecute" Donald Trump's "enemies".

The law, judges and lawyers are frequently subjects in the operas (Gilbert briefly practiced as a lawyer) and the operas have been quoted and otherwise mentioned in a large number of legal rulings and opinions. Some courts appear to reach approximately the same conclusions as Gilbert and Sullivan: "Where does this extraordinary situation leave the lower... Courts and State Courts in their required effort to apply the decisions of the Supreme Court of the United States...? Like the policeman in Gilbert and Sullivan's The Pirates of Penzance, their 'lot is not a happy one.'" On the other hand, in the case Pierson v. Ray, which established the doctrine of qualified immunity for police officers, the United States Supreme Court held that "[a] policeman's lot is not so unhappy that he must choose between being charged with dereliction of duty if he does not arrest when he had probable cause, and being punished with damages if he does." A few refer to the law as shown in Gilbert and Sullivan as being archaic. The pronouncements of the Lord Chancellor in "Iolanthe" appear to be a particular favourite in legal quotations. One U.S. Supreme Court case even discussed a contempt citation imposed on a pro se defendant who, among other conduct, compared the judge to something out of Gilbert and Sullivan.

== Phrases from the operas ==
Aside from politics, the phrase "A short, sharp shock" has appeared in titles of books and songs (most notably in samples of Pink Floyd's "The Dark Side of the Moon"). Likewise, "Let the punishment fit the crime" is an often-used phrase in the media. For instance, in episode 80 of the television series Magnum, P.I., entitled "Let the Punishment Fit the Crime", Higgins prepares to direct a selection of pieces from The Mikado to be staged at the Estate. The phrase and the Mikado's song also are featured in the Dad's Army episode, "A Soldier's Farewell." In the movie The Parent Trap (1961) the camp director quotes the same phrase before sentencing the twins to the isolation cabin together. The mobster Albert Anastasia was given the nickname "Lord High Executioner".

The character of Pooh Bah in The Mikado, who holds numerous exalted offices, including "First Lord of the Treasury, Lord Chief Justice, Commander-in-Chief, Lord High Admiral... Archbishop of Titipu, and Lord Mayor" and Lord High Everything Else, has inspired the use of the term Pooh-Bah as a mocking title for someone self-important or high-ranking and who either exhibits an inflated self-regard or who has limited authority while taking impressive titles. The term "Grand Poobah" has been used on the television shows, including The Flintstones and Happy Days as the title of a high-ranking official in a men's club, spoofing clubs like the Freemasons, the Shriners, and the Elks Club.

== Songs and parodies ==
The works of Gilbert and Sullivan, filled as they are with parodies of their contemporary culture, are themselves frequently parodied or pastiched. A notable example of this is Tom Lehrer's "The Elements", which consists of Lehrer's rhyming rendition of the names of all the chemical elements set to the music of the "Major-General's Song" from Pirates. Lehrer also includes a verse parodying a G&S finale in his patchwork of stylistic creations Clementine ("full of words and music and signifying nothing", as Lehrer put it, thus parodying G&S and Shakespeare in the same sentence).

Comedian Allan Sherman sang several parodies and pastiches of Gilbert and Sullivan songs in the 1960s, including:

- "When I was a lad I went to Yale" (about a young advertising agent, based on the patter song from H.M.S. Pinafore, with a Dixieland arrangement – at the end, he thanks old Yale, he thanks the Lord, and he thanks his father "who is chairman of the board")
- "Little Butterball" (to the tune of "I'm Called Little Buttercup" from H.M.S. Pinafore), about Sherman's admitted corpulence. This was actually a response to a song on the same subject by Stanley Ralph Ross (who was parodying Sherman's G&S routines) called "I'm Called Little Butterball", on the album My Son, the Copycat.
- "You need an analyst, a psychoanalyst" (from Allan in Wonderland) which is a variant of "I've got a little list" from The Mikado presenting, with a samba accompaniment, reasons why one might want to seek psychiatric help.
- "The Bronx Bird Watcher" (from My Son, the Celebrity) – a parody of the song "Titwillow" from The Mikado, in which the bird sings with a stereotypical Yiddish accent. Sherman is so impressed by the bird's singing that he takes him "down from his branch", and home "to mein shplit-level ranch". His wife, "Blanch", misinterprets the gift and fricassees the bird, whose last words are, "Oy! Willow! Tit-willow! Willow!"

Anna Russell performed a parody called "How to Write Your Own Gilbert and Sullivan Opera." The Two Ronnies' Gilbert and Sullivan parodies include their 1973 Christmas special. In addition, numerous G&S song parodies and other references to G&S are made in the animated TV series Animaniacs, such as the "HMS Yakko" episode, which includes its well-known parody of the "Major-General's Song", "I Am the Very Model of a Cartoon Individual", as well as pastiches of "With Cat Like Tread" (Pirates) and "I am the Captain of the Pinafore" and "Never Mind the Why and Wherefore" (H.M.S. Pinafore). Animaniacs also presented a version of "Three Little Maids" used as an audition piece in the episode "Hello Nice Warners". Disney's Mickey, Donald, Goofy: The Three Musketeers (2004) features four songs from The Pirates of Penzance and part of the overture to Princess Ida. Other comedians have used Gilbert and Sullivan songs as a key part of their routines, including Hinge and Bracket. From 1968 to 1978 Iain Kerr and Roy Cowen toured as "Goldberg & Solomon", including their two-man show, Gilbert & Sullivan Go Kosher, which they recorded.

News outlets continue to refer to the operas in news commentaries and to parody songs from the operas. Theatre parodies include a 1925 London Hippodrome revue called Better Days, which included an extended one-act parody entitled, A "G. & S." Cocktail; or, A Mixed Savoy Grill, written by Lauri Wylie, with music by Herman Finck. It was also broadcast by the BBC. It concerned a nightmare experienced by a D'Oyly Carte tenor. A 1934 operetta-style burlesque of Gilbert and Sullivan was titled Perseverance (or Half A Coronet). Written by Vivian Ellis and A. P. Herbert, it was produced at the Opera House in Manchester, and then the Palace Theatre in London, in September 1934. It was first performed as part of Charles B. Cochran's revue Streamline.

Gilbert and Sullivan songs are sometimes used in popular music. The song "Hail, Hail, the Gang's All Here" is set to the tune of "With cat-like tread" from The Pirates of Penzance (in particular, the segment that starts, "Come, friends who plough the sea"). The musical group Peter, Paul and Mary included the song, "I have a song to sing, O!" from The Yeomen of the Guard on one of their children's albums, Peter, Paul and Mommy (1969). Oscar Brand and Joni Mitchell recorded "Prithee Pretty Maiden" for the Canadian folk music TV program Let's Sing Out, broadcast by CBC Television in 1966. Todd Rundgren, Taj Mahal and Michele Gray Rundgren performed "Never Mind the Why and Wherefore" on the TV show Night Music in 1989. The songs have also been used in musicals and other entertainments. For example, the song, "My eyes are fully open" (often referred to as the "Matter Patter Trio") from Ruddigore is used (with some changed lyrics) in Papp's Broadway production of The Pirates of Penzance, and the tune of the song is used as "The Speed Test" in the musical Thoroughly Modern Millie and is heard in a season 5 episode of Spitting Image where Labour leader Neil Kinnock is portrayed singing a self-parody to the tune.

=== Other references to songs in The Mikado ===
Poster tagline adapted from The Mikado

In The Producers, a terrible auditioner for the musical Springtime for Hitler begins his audition with Nanki-Poo's song, "A Wand'ring Minstrel I." After only nine words, the director cuts him off abruptly, saying "THANK YOU!" In at least two episodes of Blackadder Goes Forth, parts of "A Wand'ring Minstrel I" are played. "There Is Beauty in the Bellow of the Blast" is performed by Richard Thompson and Judith Owen on the album 1000 Years of Popular Music. The movie poster for The Little Shop of Horrors, shown to the right, parodies the song title, "The Flowers that Bloom in the Spring, tra la!" changing the word "bloom" to "kill".

References to "Three Little Maids":

- In the 1981 film Chariots of Fire, Harold Abrahams first sees his future wife as one of the three little maids. Also, the song is featured in the soundtrack to the 1999 Anthony Edwards film Don't Go Breaking My Heart.
- Many television programs have featured the song, including the Frasier episode, "Leapin' Lizards", the Angel episode "A Hole in the World", the British TV series Keep It in the Family and Fresh Fields, The Suite Life of Zack & Cody episode "Lost in Translation", The Simpsons episode "Cape Feare", Alvin and the Chipmunks 1984 episode "Maids in Japan", and the Animaniacs vol. 1 episode "Hello Nice Warners". Magnum, P.I. also used the song when Higgins was putting on a production of "The Mikado". On the Dinah Shore Show, Shore sang the song with Joan Sutherland and Ella Fitzgerald in 1963.
- The Capitol Steps have performed parodies entitled "Three Little Kurds from School Are We" about conditions in Iraq and "Three little wives of Newt", a 2012 lampoon of candidate Newt Gingrich's marital issues.

References to "Tit-Willow" ("On a tree by a river"):

- In the Private Snafu cartoon short film The Goldbrick (1943), a fairy named Goldie the Goldbrick sings a song that is a parody of Tit-Willow. At the end of cartoon, it is revealed that Goldie is working for the Japanese.
- Television references include Groucho Marx and Dick Cavett singing the song on The Dick Cavett Show. Groucho interrupted at the line "and if you remain callous and obdurate, I shall perish as he did" to quiz the audience on the meaning of the word "obdurate". An episode of Perry Como's TV show did a parody titled "Golf Widow". A Muppet Show season 1 episode (aired on 22 November 1976) featured Rowlf the Dog and Sam Eagle singing the song, with Sam clearly embarrassed at having to sing the word "tit" and asking the meaning of "obdurate". The song is featured in the 2003 TV movie And Starring Pancho Villa as Himself.
- The song is played ominously during the murder mystery film Music for Ladies in Retirement (1941). In the 1971 film Whoever Slew Auntie Roo?, Shelley Winters as the title character sings "Tit-Willow" just before she is murdered. In John Wayne's last movie The Shootist, made in 1976, Wayne and Lauren Bacall sing several lines from "Tit-Willow", before he departs with the intention of dying in a gunfight instead of from cancer.
- In John Betjeman's documentary film Metro-Land (1973), the tune of "Tit-Willow" is heard as Betjeman, while looking over the lake at Grim's Dyke, laments W. S. Gilbert's sudden death in 1911.
- Allan Sherman's album parody is described above.

References to the "Little List" song: Sherman also did a variant on the song, described above. In a Eureeka's Castle Christmas special called "Just Put it on the List", the twins, Bogg and Quagmire, describe what they'd like for Christmas to the tune of the song. Richard Suart and A.S.H. Smyth released a book in 2008 called They'd None of 'em Be Missed, with 20 years of little list parodies by Suart, the English National Opera's usual Ko-Ko. In the Family Guy episode "Lois Kills Stewie", Stewie, after taking over the world, sings the "little list" song about those he hates, including Bill O'Reilly's dermatologist (only on the DVD edition).

References to "The sun whose rays": In addition to the poignant inclusion of the song near the end of Topsy-Turvy (1999; see below), the song has been heard in numerous film and TV soundtracks, including in the 2006 films The Zodiac and Brick and the UK TV series Lilies, in the 2007 episode "The Tallyman."

=== Other uses of songs in H.M.S. Pinafore ===
Songs from Pinafore are featured in a number of films. "When I Was a Lad" is sung by characters in the 2003 fantasy movie Peter Pan; "A British Tar" is sung in Star Trek: Insurrection (1998) and briefly sung in Raiders of the Lost Ark (1981); "For he is an Englishman" is sung in Chariots of Fire (1981), An Englishman Abroad (1983), and in the 2009 episode "Broken" of House. Matt Damon, as a young Edward Wilson, plays Little Buttercup in a Yale production and sings "I'm Called Little Buttercup" falsetto in The Good Shepherd (2006).

Songs from Pinafore are also pastiched or referred to in television episodes, including episode #3 of Animaniacs, "HMS Yakko"; "Cape Feare" episode of The Simpsons; Family Guy's episode 3.1 "The Thin White Line", among others; and the 1959 Leave it to Beaver episode #55, "The Boat Builders". "For he is an Englishman" is referred to both in the title's name and throughout The West Wing episode "And It's Surely to Their Credit" (sic), where several staffers sing along to a recording of the song to brighten up the White House counsel's day. In the 1987 Moonlighting episode "Cool Hand Dave, Part 2", a prison chain gang sings its advice to Sam to the tune of "When I was a Lad". In the 2014 episode "Daisy" of How I Met Your Mother, the Captain sings most of the recit "My Gallant Crew, Good Morning" with choral responses by his maids, and later in the episode the "what never?" joke is used.

=== Other references to songs in The Pirates of Penzance ===
The "Major-General's Song" is frequently parodied, pastiched and used in advertising. Its challenging patter has proved interesting to comics, as noted above, and has been used in numerous film and television pastiches and in political commentary. In many instances, the song, unchanged, is simply used in a film or on television as a character's audition piece, or seen in a "school play" scene. For example, in the 1983 film Never Cry Wolf, the hero sings the song. Similarly, in Kate & Leopold, Leopold sings the song while accompanying himself on the piano; however, the scene is anachronistic in that The Pirates of Penzance premiered in 1879, after Leopold had already left his own time of 1876. In the Two and a half men episode "And the Plot Moistens" (season 3, episode 21), Alan sings a verse of the song to encourage Jake to join a school musical. Similarly, in season 2 of Slings & Arrows, Richard Smith-Jones uses the song as an audition piece for a musical. In the Mad About You episode "Moody Blues", Paul directs a charity production of Penzance starring his father, Burt, as the Major-General. Parts of rehearsal and performance of the song are shown. When the lyrics slip Burt's mind, he improvises a few lines about his son.

The song is parodied or pastiched in other media: In the video games Mass Effect 2 and Mass Effect 3, the character Mordin Solus sings a short pastiche, "I am the very model of a scientist Salarian". Another pastiche of the song (among many on YouTube), also inspired by "The Elements", is the "Boy Scout Merit Badge Song", listing all the merit badges that can be earned from the Boy Scouts of America. In 2012, the webcomic xkcd published a pastiche of the song that lists the faults associated with undergraduate majors, called "Every Major's Terrible". This comic then became the subject of various musical adaptations. A nonsense pastiche of the song in the 2017 film Despicable Me 3, sung by Minions, was termed "amusing" and "the film's finest moment"; it was uploaded to YouTube by Illumination Entertainment as a singalong challenge, which has garnered more than 19 million views as of 2023.

Other examples of television renditions of the song, in addition to the Animaniacs example mentioned above, include The Muppet Show (season 3, episode 61), which staged a scene in which comedian Gilda Radner and a 7-foot-tall (2.1 m) talking carrot each assayed the "Major-General's Song" and also sampled "A Policeman's Lot" and "Poor Wand'ring One". Radner told Kermit that she had written to request a 7-foot-tall talking parrot, but he misread her handwriting: she wanted to present The Parrots of Penzance. In an episode of "Home Improvement", Al Borland, thinking he was in a sound-proof booth, belts out the first stanza but is heard by everyone. Others include the Babylon 5 episode "Atonement"; the Star Trek: The Next Generation episode Disaster; the episode of Frasier titled Fathers and Sons; the episode of The Simpsons entitled "Deep Space Homer"; two VeggieTales episodes: "The Wonderful World of Auto-Tainment" and "A Snoodle's Tale"; the Married... with Children episode "Peggy and the Pirates" (season 7, episode 18); and the 2012 Family Guy episode "Killer Queen". In the first episode of the 2020 British miniseries Quiz, about the Charles Ingram cheating scandal, Ingram and another Army officer sing the "Major-General's Song".

Parodies or pastiches of the song in television programs have included the animated series ReBoot, which ended its third season with a recap of the entire season, set to the song's tune. In the Studio 60 on the Sunset Strip episode "The Cold Open" (2006), the cast of Studio 60 opens with a parody: "We'll be the very model of a modern network TV show". In the Doctor Who Big Finish Productions audio, Doctor Who and the Pirates, the Doctor sings, "I am the very model of a Gallifreyan buccaneer" (and other songs, from Pirates, Pinafore and Ruddigore, are parodied). When he hosted Saturday Night Live, David Hyde Pierce's monologue was a parody of the song. In the 2007 Scrubs episode "My Musical", Dr. Cox sings a patter song in the style of the "Major-General's Song" about why he hates J.D.

Other songs from Pirates that have been referred to frequently include the chorus of With cat-like tread, which begins "Come, friends, who plough the sea", which was used in the American song, "Hail, Hail, the Gang's All Here", associated with Fred Astaire. For instance, "Come, friends..." is featured in Chariots of Fire (1981; discussed in more detail below). As noted above, the song was also pastiched in the "HMS Yakko" episode of Animaniacs, in a song about surfing a whale. In the movie An American Tail, Fievel huddles over a copy of the score to "Poor Wandering One", and as he wanders the streets of New York, the song plays in the background. The Smothers Brothers, beginning in 1975 on their show, occasionally performed a parody version of Poor Wand'ring One, which they repeated in the 1980s with the Boston Pops (John Williams conducting). The theme song of the cartoon character Popeye bears some similarity to "For I am a Pirate King". The pirate king's song is heard on the soundtrack of the 2000 film The Last of the Blonde Bombshells. as well as the 1997 film Wilde. In the pilot episode of the 2008 CTV series, Flashpoint, a police officer and his partner sing the policeman's song. In the 2009 Criminal Minds episode "The Slave of Duty", Hotch quotes "Oh dry the glist'ning tear".

== Literature ==
In addition to reminiscences, picture books and music books by performers, conductors and others connected with, or simply about, the D'Oyly Carte Opera Company, the Light Opera of Manhattan, the J. C. Williamson Gilbert and Sullivan Opera Company and other Gilbert and Sullivan repertory companies, numerous fictional works have been written using the G&S operas as background or imagining the lives of historical or fictional G&S performers. Recent examples include Cynthia Morey's novel about an amateur Gilbert and Sullivan company, A World That's All Our Own (2006); Bernard Lockett's Here's a State of Things (2007), a historical novel that intertwines the lives of two sets of London characters, a hundred years apart, but both connected with the Gilbert and Sullivan operas; and The Last Moriarty (2015) by Charles Veley, about an actress from D'Oyly Carte who seeks the help of Sherlock Holmes. Secret Words by Jonathan Strong uses a local production of Utopia, Limited as a background. In The Getaway Blues by William Murray, the main character names all his racehorses after Gilbert and Sullivan characters and constantly quotes G&S. Gilbert and Sullivan Set Me Free is a novel by Kathleen Karr based on a historical event in 1914, when the inmates of Sherborn Women's Prison in Massachusetts, U.S., put on a performance of The Pirates of Penzance. In the novel, the prison's chaplain uses the transformative power of music and theater to help reform the inmates, bringing them together to work on the show as a spirited community. "The Mikado" is a villainous vigilante in the comic book superhero series The Question, by Denny O'Neil and Denys Cowan. He dons a Japanese mask and kills malefactors in appropriate ways – letting "the punishment fit the crime". A humorous illustrated booklet, A Parody on Iolanthe, was written and published by D. Dalziel in 1883 and concerns the Chicago & Alton Railway.

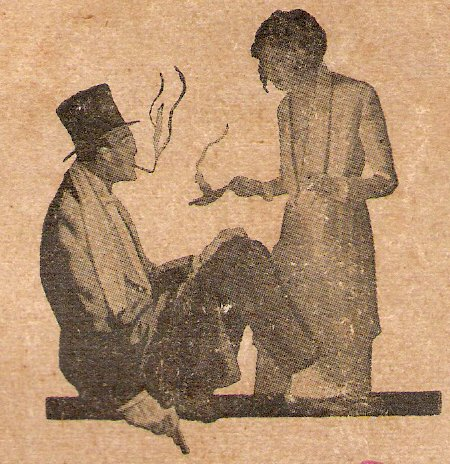
Psmith in Blandings (Leave it to Psmith) ed. 1936

There are many children's books retelling the stories of the operas, or stories about the history of the famous partnership, including two by Gilbert himself. There are also children's biographies or fictionalisations about the lives of the two men or the relationship between the two, such as the 2009 book, The Fabulous Feud of Gilbert & Sullivan. P. G. Wodehouse makes dozens of references to Gilbert and Sullivan in his works. Wodehouse sometimes referred to Gilbert at length, and he based his Psmith character on Rupert D'Oyly Carte or his brother. Wodehouse also parodied G&S songs. In Jerome K Jerome's Three Men in a Boat (1889), a description is given of Harris's attempts to sing a comic song: "the Judge's song out of Pinafore – no, I don't mean Pinafore – I mean – you know what I mean – the other thing, you know.", which turns out to be a mixture of "When I, good friends" from Trial by Jury and "When I was a lad" from Pinafore.

Several novels have used the Savoy operas as backdrop for a detective story. Death at the Opera by Gladys Mitchell (1934) involves a murder during a production of The Mikado. In Pirate King by Laurie R. King (2011), one of the Mary Russell/Sherlock Holmes series, a production company is making a silent film of The Pirates of Penzance. Other murder mysteries include The Ghosts' High Noon by John Dickson Carr (1969), named for the song of the same name in Ruddigore; The West End Horror, by Nicholas Meyer, a Sherlock Holmes pastiche involving a production of The Grand Duke (1976); The Plain Old Man by Charlotte MacLeod (1985; The Sorcerer); Perish in July by Mollie Hardwick (1989; Yeomen) Ruddy Gore by Kerry Greenwood (a Phryne Fisher book, 1995; Ruddigore); Murder and Sullivan by Sara Hoskinson Frommer (1997; Ruddigore); Death of a Pooh-Bah by Karen Sturges (2000; Mikado); and Vengeance Dire by Roberta Morrell (2001; Pirates);

Other mystery books and stories involve Gilbert and/or Sullivan to a lesser degree. The Dalziel and Pascoe books of Reginald Hill contain many references to G&S. One of the recurring characters, Sergeant Wield is a G&S fan. In the Ruth Rendell mysteries, Chief Inspector Wexford likes to sing G&S in the shower. A series of eight novels by Tom Holt, written from 2003 to 2023, concern young sorcerers who join the firm of "J. W. Wells & Co", including The Portable Door (2023), which was adapted for film, and In Your Dreams (2004). Death's Bright Angel, by Janet Neel, is named for a line in Sullivan's "The Lost Chord", which figures in the story. Mark Twain's The Man That Corrupted Hadleyburg prominently features a pastiche from "The criminal cried" in the climactic scene. In scenes 2 and 7 of The Glass Menagerie Laura discusses that Jim had a starring role in a high school production of Pirates.

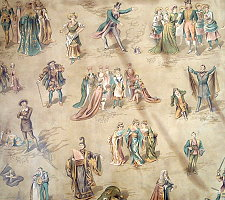
Wallpaper showing characters from the Savoy operas

Science fiction author Isaac Asimov, a fan of Gilbert & Sullivan, found inspiration for his famous Foundation Trilogy while reading Iolanthe. Asimov was fascinated by some of the paradoxes that occur in their works and mysteries surrounding their manuscripts. He wrote several stories exploring these, including one about a time-traveller who goes back in time to save the score to Thespis. Another, called "The Year of the Action" (1980), concerns whether the action of Pirates took place on 1 March 1873, or 1 March 1877. That is, did Gilbert forget, or not know, that 1900 was not a leap year? In "Runaround", a story in I, Robot, a robot, while in a state similar to drunkenness, sings snippets of "There Grew a Little Flower" (from Ruddigore), "I'm Called Little Buttercup" (from Pinafore), "When I First Put This Uniform On" (from Patience), and "The Nightmare Song" (from Iolanthe). He also wrote a short story called "The Up-To-Date Sorcerer" that is a parody of and homage to The Sorcerer. In addition, Asimov wrote "The Author's Ordeal" (1957), a pastiche of a Gilbert and Sullivan patter song similar to the Lord Chancellor's Nightmare Song from Iolanthe, depicting the agonies that Asimov went through in thinking up a new science fiction story. Another such pastiche is "The Foundation of S.F. Success" (1954). Both are included in his collection of short stories Earth Is Room Enough. The Rats, Bats and Vats series also includes numerous G&S character names and phrases, since the D'Oyly Carte recordings of their work provide a portion of the language material for the genetically engineered and cybernetically enhanced "rats" in the stories. Another science fiction author, Robert A. Heinlein, referred to the "Little List" song in his Hugo Award-winning 1961 novel, Stranger in a Strange Land. There, when a character discovers the protagonist's ability to make objects and people disappear, mulls: "I've got a little list... they'd none of them be missed." Anne McCaffrey also seems fond of The Pirates of Penzance—several characters pass the time with it in Power Play, and references to "When the foeman bares his steel" appear in Crystal Line.

== Film ==
Film references

Aside from filmed versions, such as for Pirates, Mikado and Yeomen, and other adaptations of Gilbert and Sullivan operas, several films have treated the G&S partnership: Mike Leigh's film Topsy-Turvy (1999) is a film depiction of the team and the creation of their best known opera, The Mikado. Another G&S film is the 1953 The Story of Gilbert and Sullivan (or The Great Gilbert and Sullivan in the U.S.), starring Robert Morley as Gilbert and Maurice Evans as Sullivan, with Martyn Green as George Grossmith. In a short 1950 film called The Return of Gilbert and Sullivan, Gilbert and Sullivan return to Earth after their copyright in the music has expired to protest the jazz treatment of their work. In the 1951 film The Magic Box Sir Arthur Sullivan, played by the film conductor Muir Mathieson, conducts a choral concert of the Bath Choral Society. Barry Purves made a short stop motion animated G&S biopic in 1998 called Gilbert & Sullivan: The Very Models.

Film adaptations of the operas have included a 1926 D'Oyly Carte Opera Company short promotional film of The Mikado that featured some of the most famous Savoyards, including Darrell Fancourt, Henry Lytton, Leo Sheffield, Elsie Griffin, and Bertha Lewis. In 1939, Universal Pictures released a ninety-minute technicolor film adaptation of The Mikado. It stars Martyn Green as Ko-Ko and Sydney Granville as Pooh-Bah. The music was conducted by Geoffrey Toye, who was credited with the adaptation. William V. Skall received an Academy Award nomination for Best Cinematography. Similarly, in 1966, the D'Oyly Carte produced a film version of The Mikado, which showed much of their traditional staging at the time, although there are some minor cuts. It stars John Reed (Ko-Ko), Kenneth Sandford (Pooh-Bah), Valerie Masterson (Yum-Yum), Donald Adams (the Mikado), Peggy Ann Jones (Pitti-Sing), and Philip Potter (Nanki-Poo).

Several film scores draw heavily on the G&S repertoire, including The Matchmaker (1958; featuring Pinafore and Mikado music), I Could Go On Singing (1963; Pinafore music), The Bad News Bears Go to Japan (1978; many excerpts from The Mikado), The Adventures of Milo and Otis (1989; using several G&S themes), The Browning Version (1994; music from The Mikado), The Hand that Rocks the Cradle (1992; songs from Pinafore and Pirates) and The Pirate Movie (1982; spoofs of songs from Pirates; in fact, the whole movie itself is a spoof of Pirates!). In Chariots of Fire, the protagonist, Harold Abrahams, marries a woman who appears with the D'Oyly Carte Opera Company. He and members of the Cambridge Gilbert and Sullivan Club sing "He is an Englishman" (H.M.S. Pinafore). The soundtrack of Chariots also features "Three Little Maids from School Are We" (The Mikado), "With Catlike Tread" (Pirates), "The Soldiers of Our Queen" (Patience), and "There Lived a King" (The Gondoliers). In The Girl Said No (1937), which uses songs from the operas, a dance hall girl is forced to join a Gilbert and Sullivan troupe. In The Naughty Victorians (1975), an X-rated film based on the novel The Way of a Man with a Maid, the entire score is G&S music, and many musical puns are made, with the G&S music underlining the dialogue appropriately for those familiar with G&S. In The White Countess (2005), the overture to H.M.S. Pinafore is used in the soundtrack.

In other films, characters sing songs from the operas. In Star Trek: Insurrection (1998), Captain Picard and Lt. Commander Worf sing lines from "A British Tar" from Pinafore to distract a malfunctioning Lt. Commander Data. In Kate & Leopold (2001), among other Pirates references, Leopold sings the "Major-General's Song", accompanying himself on the piano. The lead characters of the 2015 film Those People sing along to the song in duelling fashion. In The Good Shepherd (2006), Matt Damon's character sings Little Buttercup's song falsetto in an all-male version of Pinafore at Yale University. In another Matt Damon film, The Talented Mr. Ripley (1999), the song "We're Called Gondolieri" is featured in the soundtrack. In Raiders of the Lost Ark (1981), the character Sallah sings Pinafore tunes, including "A British Tar". In the 2003 fantasy movie Peter Pan, the Darling family sings "When I Was A Lad". The 1969 film Age of Consent featured the song "Take a Pair of Sparkling Eyes" from The Gondoliers. In the 1971 film Whoever Slew Auntie Roo?, Shelley Winters as the title character sings the song just before she is murdered. In the 1988 drama Permanent Record, a high school class performs Pinafore. Judy Garland sings "I am the monarch of the sea" in the film, I Could Go On Singing.

In a number of films, a significant part of the action is set during a G&S opera. With Words and Music (1937) involves a bookie who revives a washed-up troupe of Savoyards by mounting a production of The Mikado. Foul Play (1978) features an assassination attempt that culminates during a showing of The Mikado. The thwarted assassin falls into the rigging used as a backdrop for H.M.S. Pinafore. Similarly, in Disney's cartoon Mickey, Donald, Goofy: The Three Musketeers (2004), the finale occurs at the Paris Opéra during a G&S performance. The score features "With cat-like tread", "The Major-General's Song", "Climbing over rocky mountain", "Poor wandering one", and part of the overture from Princess Ida. The plot concerns a performance of The Pirates of Penzance that becomes the setting for the climactic battle between the Musketeers and Captain Pete.

In other films, there have simply been prominent references to one or more of the operas. For instance, in Pretty Woman, Edward Lewis (Richard Gere) covered a social gaffe by prostitute Vivian Ward (Julia Roberts), who said that the opera La traviata was so good that she almost "peed in [her] pants" by pretending that she had said that she liked it almost as much as "The Pirates of Penzance." In Making Love (1982), Michael Ontkean and Kate Jackson are a happy G&S-loving couple until he leaves her for another man (Harry Hamlin).

== Television ==
Gilbert and Sullivan, and songs from the operas, have been included in numerous TV series, including The Simpsons in several episodes, including "Cape Feare", "Deep Space Homer", and "Bart's Inner Child"; numerous Frasier episodes; Kavanagh QC, in the episode "Briefs Trooping Gaily", Angel in the fifth season episode "Conviction", where Charles Gunn becomes a good lawyer, and learns a lot of G&S, because it's "great for elocution"; numerous references in Animaniacs; the episode "The Cold Open" (1x02) of Studio 60 on the Sunset Strip; the episode "Atonement" of Babylon 5; in the Australian soap opera Neighbours, Harold Bishop often makes G&S references; references in the VeggieTales episodes "Lyle the Kindly Viking", "The Wonderful World of Auto-Tainment", "The Star of Christmas" (a Christmas special entirely devoted to spoofing G&S and their operas), and "Sumo of the Opera"; Family Guy referred to and parodied G&S a number of times, especially in season four (beside the examples named above and below, see "Patriot Games", which includes the song from The Sorcerer, "If you'll marry me"); and Batman sings a verse of "I'm called little Buttercup" in a 1966 episode. In the UK series Lilies, in the 2007 episode "The Tallyman" both "When I Was a Lad" and "The Sun Whose Rays" are heard. An episode of Car 54, Where Are You? has parodies of several G&S songs. In 1988, episodes of Australian soap opera Home and Away featured a school production of The Mikado. A second-season (1998) episode of the TV show Millennium titled "The Mikado" is based on the Zodiak Killer case. In a 2022 episode of Midsomer Murders, titled "For Death Prepare", an amateur operatic society rehearses a charity concert of Pirates, when a dead body is found in their theatre.

Gilbert and Sullivan references often appeared in The West Wing. Some incidents include an episode-long argument over whether "He is an Englishman" is from H.M.S. Pinafore or The Pirates of Penzance, after one character's invocation of "duty", in the episode And It's Surely to Their Credit; President Bartlet's gift of a CD of The Yeomen of the Guard to his aide Charlie in Stirred; references to The Pirates of Penzance in Mandatory Minimums and Inauguration, Part I; and an excerpt from "A Wand'ring Minstrel I" in A Change Is Gonna Come. Character Sam Seaborn, the Deputy Communications Director, is the former recording secretary of the Princeton Gilbert and Sullivan Society. Creator Aaron Sorkin has stated that the characters' love for Gilbert and Sullivan is part of his attempt to avoid referring to current political and entertainment personalities and to set it in a "parallel universe."

The following are examples of references to some of the best-known G&S operas:

- The Mikado: In addition to those mentioned above, a Magnum, P.I. episode is entitled "Let the Punishment Fit the Crime"; Larry David's show Curb Your Enthusiasm uses "Three Little Maids" from The Mikado as background music. The Frasier episode, "Leapin' Lizards", the Angel episode "Hole in the World", The Simpsons episodes "Cape Feare" and "The Bob Next Door", Alvin and the Chipmunks episode "Maids in Japan", and The Animaniacs Vol. 1 episode "Hello Nice Warners" all parody "Three Little Maids". A Muppet Show episode featured Rowlf the Dog and Sam Eagle singing "Tit-Willow". In the 2010 episode "Robots Versus Wrestlers" of the TV sitcom How I Met Your Mother, someone's wife is compared with a 500-year-old gong that "hasn't been struck since W. S. Gilbert hit it at the London premiere of The Mikado in 1885!"
- H.M.S. Pinafore: In the "Cape Feare" episode of The Simpsons, Bart Simpson stalls his would-be killer, Sideshow Bob, with a "final request" that Bob sing him the entire score of Pinafore. Similarly, the "HMS Yakko" episode of Animaniacs consists of pastiches of songs from H.M.S. Pinafore and The Pirates of Penzance. A Pinky and the Brain song called "Meticulous Analysis of History" is set to the tune of "When I was a lad", while the "Lord Bravery" theme song in Freakazoid! uses the tune from the chorus of "A British Tar". In Family Guy's episode 3.1, "The Thin White Line", Stewie Griffin imagines himself to be a sea captain and sings a pastiche of "My gallant crew" implying that he sleeps with his crew. In the film, Family Guy Presents Stewie Griffin: The Untold Story, Stewie gives sex lessons by singing "I am the monarch of the sea" to illustrate rhythm. The scene is repeated in Family Guy episode 4.30, "Stu and Stewie's Excellent Adventure". A 1986 Mr. Belvedere episode, "The Play", concerns a production of H.M.S. Pinafore, and several of the songs are performed. The song "He is an Englishman" is referenced both in the title's name and throughout The West Wing episode "And It's Surely to Their Credit". In 1955, NBC broadcast a variety special including a 20-minute compressed jazz version, "H.M.S. Pinafore in Jazz", produced and directed by Max Liebman, starring Perry Como, Buddy Hackett, Kitty Kallen, Bill Hayes, Pat Carroll and Herb Shriner.
- Pirates: In addition to those already mentioned above, in Studio 60 on the Sunset Strip, a poster from "The Pirates of Penzance" hangs on Matt Albie's (Matthew Perry) office wall. In Family Guy episode 4.11, "Peter's Got Woods", Brian Griffin sings "Sighing softly to the river", and in episode 10.16, "Killer Queen" (2012), Peter Griffin sings a garbled rendition of the "Major-General's Song". In a 1986 episode of the animated television adaptation of The Wind in the Willows entitled A Producer's Lot, several characters put on a production of Pirates. In the 1992 episode "The Understudy" of Clarissa Explains It All, the title character is chosen to understudy Mabel in a school production of Pirates and is unprepared when she must go on; a scene from The Mikado is also quoted.

== Other media ==
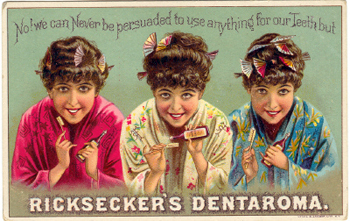
Advertisement featuring Mikado characters

The operas and songs from the operas have often been used or parodied in advertising. According to Jones, "Pinafore launched the first media blitz in the United States" beginning in 1879. For example, Gimbels department store had a campaign sung to the tune of the "Major-General's Song" that began, "We are the very model of a modern big department store." in a 2011 Geico commercial, a couple that wants to save money, but still listen to musicals, finds a roommate, dressed as the Major General, who awkwardly begins the song while dancing on a coffee table. Similarly, Martyn Green sang a pastiche of the song listing all of the varieties of Campbell's Soup. Another prominent example is the elaborate illustrated book, called My Goodness! My Gilbert and Sullivan! of parodies of Gilbert's lyrics advertising Guinness stout. The likenesses (often in costume) of, or endorsements by, numerous Gilbert and Sullivan performers were used in advertising throughout the decades. Trading cards were also created, using images from some of the operas to advertise various products. There was also a series of Currier and Ives prints. Several series of cigarette cards were issued by Player's cigarette company depicting characters from the Savoy operas wearing the costumes used by the D'Oyly Carte Opera Company. Numerous postcards were published with photos or illustrations of D'Oyly Carte and other performers and scenes from the operas and other Gilbert plays. More recently, television ads for Terry's Chocolate Orange from the 2000s featured a pastiche of "When I Was a Lad" from Pinafore.

Both Nelson Eddy and Danny Kaye recorded albums of selections from the Gilbert and Sullivan operas. Al Goodman and Groucho Marx also released Gilbert and Sullivan recordings. The operas are referred to in other media, including video games. For example, in Grand Theft Auto: San Andreas, a casino is called "Pirates in Men's Pants", a crude play on Pirates of Penzance. The 1970s singer Gilbert O'Sullivan adopted his stage name as a pun on "Gilbert and Sullivan" when his manager suggested that it would be good marketing. In the 1950s, the British radio show Take It from Here featured parodies of Gilbert and Sullivan songs with lyrics about the buses in London.

The apposite anagram of H.M.S. Pinafore → "name for ship" was used in cryptic crosswords in The Times.

== Notes ==
=== References ===
- Arnold, David L. G. (2003). ""Use a pen, Sideshow Bob: The Simpsons and the Threat of High Culture". In Alberti, John (ed.). Leaving Springfield: The Simpsons and the Possibility of Oppositional Culture. Wayne State University Press. ISBN 978-0-8143-2849-1.
- Baily, Leslie (1966). The Gilbert and Sullivan Book (new ed.). London: Spring Books. ISBN 0-500-13046-9.
- Bradley, Ian (2005). Oh Joy! Oh Rapture!: The Enduring Phenomenon of Gilbert and Sullivan. Oxford, England: Oxford University Press. ISBN 978-0-19-516700-9.
- Coward, Noël (1953). The Noël Coward Song Book, London: Methuen
- Cellier, François; Cunningham Bridgeman (1914). Gilbert and Sullivan and Their Operas. London: Sir Isaac Pitman & Sons.
- Dillard, Philip H. How Quaint the Ways of Paradox! Metuchen, New Jersey: The Scarecrow Press (1991) ISBN 978-0-8108-2445-4
- Hischak, Thomas S. (2009). Broadway Plays and Musicals: Descriptions and Essential Facts of More Than 14,000 Shows Through 2007. Jefferson, North Carolina: McFarland & Co. ISBN 9780786453092.
- Lockett, Bernard (2007). Here's a State of Things Melrose Books, Ely ISBN 978-1-905226-96-2
- Murray, William (1990). The Getaway Blues, Bantam ISBN 978-0-553-07029-3
- Suart, Richard and Smyth, A. S. H. They'd None of 'em Be Missed, Pallas Athene. ISBN 978-1-84368-036-9
