= The Pirates of Penzance discography =

This is a partial discography of Gilbert and Sullivan's opera The Pirates of Penzance, which premiered on 31 December 1879, at the Fifth Avenue Theatre in New York City.

Year	Cast: The Pirate King, Mabel, Ruth, Frederic, Major-General Stanley, Samuel, Sergeant of Police, Edith	Conductor, Chorus and orchestra	Label
1949	Darrell Fancourt, Muriel Harding, Ella Halman, Leonard Osborn, Martyn Green, Donald Harris, Joan Gillingham	Isidore Godfrey, Chorus and Orchestra of the D'Oyly Carte Opera Company	LP:Decca; Cat: DPA 3051/2 mono
1961	James Milligan, Elsie Morison, Monica Sinclair, Richard Lewis, George Baker, John Cameron, Owen Brannigan, Heather Harper	Malcolm Sargent, Pro Arte Orchestra, Glyndebourne Festival Chorus	EMI
1968	Donald Adams, Valerie Masterson, Christene Palmer, Philip Potter, John Reed, George Cook, Owen Brannigan, Carol Malone	Isidore Godfrey, Royal Philharmonic Orchestra and D'Oyly Carte Opera Chorus	Decca Studios
1981	Kevin Kline, Linda Ronstadt, Estelle Parsons, Rex Smith, George Rose, Stephan Hanan, Tony Azito, Alexandra Korey	William Elliott, conductor Original Broadway Cast Album	Columbia Records
1982	Peter Allen, Janis Kelly, Gillian Knight, Alexander Oliver, Keith Michell, Brian Donlan, Paul Hudson, Kate Flowers	Alexander Faris, Ambrosian Opera Chorus, London Symphony Orchestra	VHS: Polygram; Cat: 632 5283 (Video); OperaWorld PIR10V (Video)
1990	Malcolm Rivers, Marilyn Hill Smith, Susan Gorton, Philip Creasy, Eric Roberts, Gareth Jones, Simon Masterton, Patricia Cameron	John Pryce-Jones; Chorus and Orchestra of the D'Oyly Carte Opera Company	CD: TER 1177; Showtime SHOW CD010 (CD) (85'24)
1993	Donald Adams, Rebecca Evans, Gillian Knight, John Mark Ainsley, Richard Suart, Nicholas Folwell, Richard Van Allan, Julie Gossage	Charles Mackerras, Chorus & Orchestra of the Welsh National Opera	CD: Telarc; Cat: 80353
1994	Anna Butera; Helen Donaldson; Jon English; Susie French; Simon Gallaher; Marc James; Toni Lamond; Melissa Langton; Derek Metzger; Tim Tyler	Kevin Hocking	CD: CD:ABC/EMI Records; Cat: 4797752

For a more complete discography up to 2009, see Marc Shepherd's discography at the Gilbert and Sullivan archive.
