= Isidore Godfrey =

British music conductor

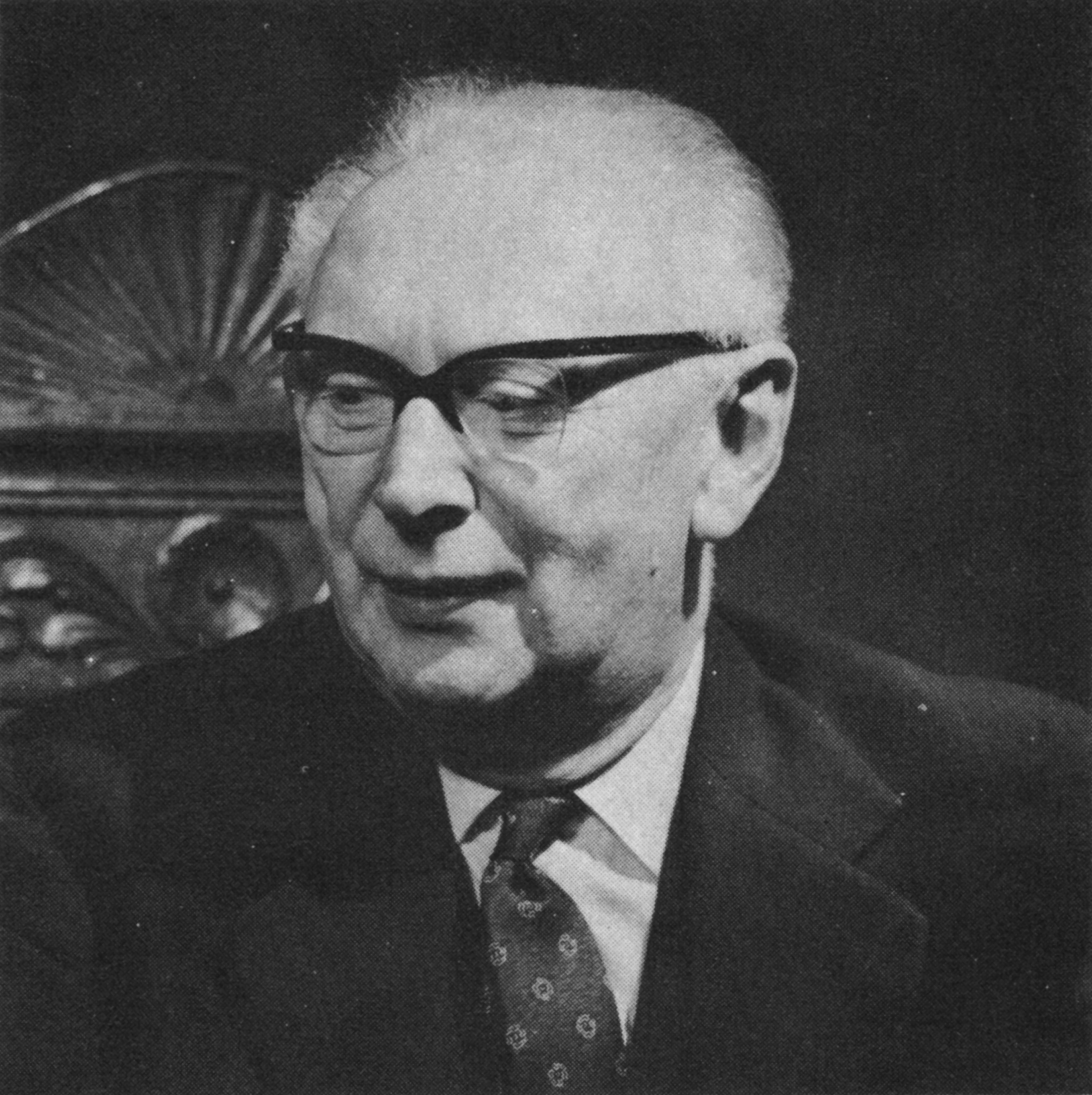
Godfrey, c. 1962

Isidore Godfrey OBE (27 September 1900 – 12 September 1977), born Israel Gotfryd, was musical director of the D'Oyly Carte Opera Company for 39 years, from 1929 to 1968. He conducted most of the company's performances during that period, except for a few London seasons when Malcolm Sargent was guest conductor and brief periods in the summers of 1947 and 1948 when Boyd Neel filled in as guest conductor.

Godfrey led the company in numerous tours, both domestic and foreign, during his tenure, and he conducted most of the company's recordings over that long period. Widely admired and well-liked, Godfrey trained at the Guildhall School of Music in piano while working as an accompanist in London. He joined the D'Oyly Carte Opera Company as chorus master and assistant musical director of one of its touring companies in 1925, and in 1929 took over as musical director on the retirement of Harry Norris. Thereafter, his entire career was with D'Oyly Carte. He conducted and recorded all eleven of the Gilbert and Sullivan operas, plus Cox and Box, that were performed by the company at the time. From the 1930s, he conducted several broadcasts of the Gilbert and Sullivan operas by the BBC, relayed live from the Savoy Theatre.

In June 1965 Godfrey was awarded the OBE, and in 1966, he conducted a film version of The Mikado, one of only a few films ever made by the company. He retired from the D'Oyly Carte company in 1968. He was married three times, for the longest period to Ann Drummond-Grant, a company principal who died in 1959.

== Life and career ==
Godfrey was born in London as Israel Gotfryd, the son of Polish-Jewish immigrants Manas Gotfryd (1858–1934), a hairdresser, and Frymet ("Fanny"), née Wontroba (born 1871); originally from Płock, the family Anglicised their surname to Godfrey, the parents becoming naturalised British subjects in 1905. He had older sisters Annie, a violinist (born 1888) and Flora, an actress as "Freda Godfrey" (1889–1980), and a younger brother David (born 1909). Godfrey was educated at The Haberdashers' Aske's Boys' School, then in Hampstead. There he enjoyed studying science. As a small child, he first studied the violin but soon preferred the piano. He studied the piano under George Woodhouse, a pupil of Theodor Leschetizky, and in 1914 made a public appearance, at the age of 13, playing in a joint recital at the Bechstein Hall given by Woodhouse's pupils. Godfrey subsequently trained at the Guildhall School of Music in the piano under George B. Aitken (composer of "Maire, my girl"). At the school, he won prizes for ensemble playing, the school's Gold Medal for piano, the annual Mercers' Scholarship and later the Chappel Piano Company Prize. He briefly studied conducting under Julius Harrison near the end of his training. While still a student, he performed as an accompanist in London, sometimes playing for his sister when she performed on the violin at theatres and music halls.

=== Early career ===
On the recommendation of the Guildhall School's principal, Sir Landon Ronald, Godfrey joined the D'Oyly Carte Opera Company as chorus master and assistant musical director of its smaller touring company in April 1925. He moved to the main company in May 1926 and in 1929 took over as musical director on the retirement of Harry Norris. Thereafter, his entire career was with D'Oyly Carte. A rare exception to touring with the company came in December 1932, when he shared the conducting with Sir Thomas Beecham at a royal charity matinée before King George V and Queen Mary. In the same month, Godfrey conducted the first complete broadcast of a Gilbert and Sullivan opera, The Yeomen of the Guard, on Christmas Eve 1932, relayed live from the Savoy Theatre by the BBC. Godfrey conducted all the extant Gilbert and Sullivan operas plus Cox and Box, in performance and for recordings, except Utopia Limited and The Grand Duke, though he recorded excerpts from the former. (Rupert D'Oyly Carte had considered reviving Utopia in the 1920s, but abandoned the idea as too expensive.)

Godfrey conducted most of the company's performances during his four decades as musical director, except for a few London seasons, when Malcolm Sargent was guest conductor, and brief periods in the summers of 1947 and 1948, when Boyd Neel was guest conductor. Godfrey's assistant musical directors included Alan E. Ward (1930–49), William Cox-Ife (1951–61) and James Walker (1961–68). During Godfrey's long reign as musical director, he conducted artists who had worked under the direction of W. S. Gilbert, such as Henry Lytton, Leo Sheffield and Sydney Granville, and those who were performing at the last night of the D'Oyly Carte Opera Company in 1982, such as John Reed and Kenneth Sandford. In his early years in charge, Godfrey, with Rupert D'Oyly Carte's backing, gradually cut down the number of encores routinely given at the company's performances. The stars and the audiences both resisted, but Godfrey eventually made progress, particularly after the outbreak of World War II, when it was important to keep running times down to a reasonable length.

=== Touring and later years ===
During his four decades as musical director, Godfrey took the D'Oyly Carte Opera Company on many tours, including eleven to America. The company did not travel with an orchestra but instead engaged players locally. Godfrey recalled, "We would pick up perhaps eight orchestral players in the first town, take them with us on the tour and make up the orchestra with local players from each of the towns we visited.... On one occasion, I was rehearsing the Mikado overture when I noticed that one of the double-basses was plucking the strings in the opening bars. I pointed out that it was not to be played pizzicato but arco, with the bow. 'Yeah', he said. 'But I haven't got a bow.' That's how it was sometimes!"

In wartime Britain, the orchestral situation on tour sometimes verged on collapse. Godfrey's weekly reports to the company office in London included wry accounts of drummers in Oxford who could not read music, a nervous cellist in Liverpool who played on three strings at once and a bass player in Wimbledon who took a night off and sent an inebriated substitute. Even in peacetime, Godfrey was not lavishly provided for in the orchestra pit. In the 1950s, the magazine The Gramophone commented: "Whenever Mr. Isidore Godfrey enters the orchestra pit to direct an opera by Sullivan, to whose music he has devoted much of his life, he must presumably steel his aesthetic sense to doing justice to the composer with the tiny forces at his disposal. ... One presumes that an opera company with a repertory of ten operas, playing to capacity without expensive stars and only repairs to scenery and costumes and with royalties pouring in from all over the country, could afford a permanent orchestra of reasonable strength."

In June 1965 Godfrey was awarded the OBE; The Gramophone commented that "nothing short of a dukedom" could adequately reward him. In 1966, he conducted a film version of The Mikado, one of only a few films ever made by the company. He retired from the D'Oyly Carte company in February 1968 and was succeeded as musical director by his deputy, James Walker, formerly of Decca Records. Godfrey married two members of the company – first, a soprano chorister, Marguerite Kynaston, about 1919 (they later divorced), and, in 1940, the soprano (later contralto) principal Ann Drummond-Grant. After Drummond-Grant died in 1959, Godfrey married a third time, in 1961, to Glenda Gladys Mary née Cleaver. After retirement, when he held the honorary position of President of the associate members of the D'Oyly Carte Trust, ill-health prevented him from making many guest appearances, but he conducted H.M.S. Pinafore during the company's centenary season at the Savoy in 1975.

Godfrey died in London in 1977 just short of his 77th birthday.

== Reputation ==
Godfrey was widely admired for his consistent skill in giving Arthur Sullivan's scores their essential joie de vivre. As early as 1926, Malcolm Sargent joining the D'Oyly Carte Opera Company found "a brilliant young assistant named Isidore Godfrey whom I realised at once was made of the right stuff for Sullivan". In the 1930s, Neville Cardus praised Godfrey's musicianship and commanding presence, adding, "Mr Godfrey deserves a bigger band":

Mr Isidore Godfrey approaches his evening's labours with an imperious gesture; he swings round, and with a comprehensive eye reduces even a Gilbert and Sullivan audience to silence for an overture – a very remarkable feat of hypnotism. And then Mr Godfrey's baton attacks the score, as though about to plunge us into Götterdämmerung with his thin Falstaff's army of an orchestra.... Mr Godfrey by sheer force seems to draw some sonority out of his pitifully inadequate instrumental forces; Toscanini could do no more.

In the 1960s, Philip Hope-Wallace of The Guardian spoke of "the animation, command and sheer genius for keeping things up to the mark of this most devoted servant of the tradition." Of a 1964 performance of Iolanthe at New York City Center, the New York Herald Tribune reported, "The carrot thatch we have loved all these years has now burnished to a silver gold alloy but it could have been dark green for all we cared. What really mattered was that [Godfrey] was there ... and that the Company was in superb condition, the best that it has been in for years." The New York Times concurred, "Isidore Godfrey, happily a fixture in the pit, leads the overture with a respect and affection for its delicacies and that is the fashion in which he orders the musical side of the entire performance." "If ever a knighthood were deserved in the cause of true musical devotion, it is here", wrote the critic Ivan March in The Great Records. In 2007 The Penguin Guide to Recorded Classical Music praised him as "inimitable".

A dissenting voice was the critic Rodney Milnes, who spoke of Godfrey's recordings as "leaden, lumpen and dull", but his fellow critic Hugo Cole, who had been a D'Oyly Carte orchestra player, praised Godfrey, who, he said, knew "not only every note of every part, but every place where a player had ever been known to miss an entry. He was like Henry Wood in that if you watched him you couldn't come in wrong." Members of the company from Leslie Rands in the 1920s to John Reed in the 1960s praised Godfrey – known to company members as "Goddie" – for his musicianship and friendliness.

== Recordings ==
Godfrey's first recording with the D'Oyly Carte Opera Company was the 1933 The Sorcerer highlights for His Master's Voice, followed by his first complete opera, The Mikado in 1936. When the company returned to the recording studio after World War II, Godfrey conducted a series of eleven complete recordings from 1949–55 for Decca, comprising all the Gilbert and Sullivan operas in its repertory.

From 1957–66, the company re-recorded its full repertory for Decca, this time in stereo, adding the first professional recording of Cox and Box and highlights from Utopia, Limited. Godfrey once again conducted the entire series, except for Princess Ida and The Yeomen of the Guard, for which Sir Malcolm Sargent was guest conductor.

His final recordings for the company were a film of The Mikado in 1966 and the company's second stereo recording of The Pirates of Penzance in 1968.
