= Stuart Burge =

English stage and film director (1918–2002)

Stuart Burge CBE (15 January 1918 – 24 January 2002) was an English stage and film director, actor and producer.

The son of H. O. Burge, by his marriage to K. M. Haig, Burge was educated at Eagle House School, Sandhurst, and Felsted School, Essex, then trained for an acting career at the Old Vic, 1936–37, and at Oxford Rep, 1937–38. He was back at the Old Vic and appearing in the West End theatre in 1938–39, then during the Second World War of 1939–45 he served in the British Army's Intelligence Corps. After the war he returned to his acting career at the Bristol Old Vic, the Young Vic, and the Commercial Theatre, between 1946 and 1949.

He was a director by 1948. He was responsible for many distinguished productions for both stage and television, including four film adaptations of plays.

He married Josephine Parker, an American actress, and had five children: Lucy Burge, Stephen Burge, Nicholas Burge, Matthew Burge and Emma Burge.

== Selected filmography ==
=== As director ===
- 1956 : David Copperfield (TV)
- 1959 : Back to Back (TV)
- 1959 : Julius Caesar (TV)
- 1959 : The Third Man (TV)
- 1959 : The Waltz of the Toreadors
- 1959 : Crime of Passion (TV)
- 1960 : There Was a Crooked Man
- 1962 : The Ghost Sonata (TV)
- 1963 : Uncle Vanya
- 1964 : Danger Man (TV)
- 1965 : Othello
- 1966 : Nelson: A Study in Miniature (TV)
- 1967 : The Mikado
- 1967 : Play with a Tiger (TV)
- 1970 : Married Alive (TV)
- 1970 : Julius Caesar
- 1974 : Fall of Eagles (TV)
- 1975 : Under Western Eyes (TV)
- 1976 : Bill Brand (TV)
- 1978 : Rumpole of the Bailey (TV)
- 1981 : Sons and Lovers (TV)
- 1982 : Play for Tomorrow (TV)
- 1983 : The Home Front (TV)
- 1983 : The Old Men at the Zoo (TV)
- 1984 : Much Ado About Nothing (TV)
- 1985 : The Moon Over Soho (TV)
- 1986 : The Importance of Being Earnest (TV)
- 1986 : Naming the Names (TV)
- 1986 : Breaking Up (TV)
- 1988 : Dinner at Noon (TV)
- 1988 : The Rainbow (BBC miniseries)
- 1989 : Chinese Whispers (TV)
- 1991 : The House of Bernarda Alba (TV)
- 1992 : After the Dance (TV)
- 1993 : The Wexford Trilogy by Billy Roche: A Handful of Stars, Poor Beast in the Rain and Belfry (BBC TV)
- 1994 : Seaforth (TV)

=== As actor ===
- 1953 : The Malta Story (Paolo)

== Stage, technical direction ==
- 1950 : Twelfth Night Old Vic Company/British Council touring production, Teatro Comunale Giuseppe Verdi, Free Territory of Trieste
