= Christene Palmer =

Australian singer and actress

Christene M. Palmer is a retired Australian singer and actress, known for her performances in the contralto roles of Gilbert and Sullivan's Savoy operas with the D'Oyly Carte Opera Company during the 1960s. Her performance as Katisha in The Mikado is preserved in the D'Oyly Carte 1967 film version of that opera.

== Life and career ==
Palmer was born in Geelong, Victoria, Australia. During high school she studied singing, piano and harmony before going to Melbourne for further voice training and joined the Oriana Madrigal Choir. In 1952 she was a semi-finalist in the Star for Opera Quest for the Royal South Street Society. The following year, she entered the Mobil Quest singing competition organised by the Vacuum Oil Company. In 1958 and 1960, she sang roles with the Elizabethan Opera Trust and solos at the annual Bach Festivals in Melbourne.

Palmer moved to London in 1961 to study at the National School of Opera there and performed on the concert stage and in opera, and was in the Glyndebourne Festival Opera chorus for two seasons, before joining the D'Oyly Carte Opera Company in 1965. She was with D'Oyly Carte for six years, singing the contralto roles in all nine of the Gilbert and Sullivan operas performed by the company during her tenure (The Sorcerer was not performed by the company until just before she left in 1971). These roles were: Little Buttercup in H.M.S. Pinafore, Ruth in The Pirates of Penzance, Lady Jane in Patience, the Queen of the Fairies in Iolanthe, Lady Blanche in Princess Ida, Katisha in The Mikado, Dame Hannah in Ruddigore, Dame Carruthers in The Yeomen of the Guard, and the Duchess of Plaza-Toro in The Gondoliers. At the same time, she occasionally performed in concerts with Gilbert and Sullivan for All.

Palmer married Norman Wilfred Wright in 1970, who also appeared with the D'Oyly Carte Opera Company as a tenor in the chorus, from 1969 to 1971, and then with other opera companies. They have 3 children together, Stephen (born 1971), Chris (born 1974), and Catherine (born 1977) Wright. The family moved to Australia later in the 1970s, then returned to the UK in 1980 and settled in Nuneaton, where they directed productions for amateur opera companies, including the Coventry Savoyards. Wright performed with the Magic of Gilbert and Sullivan concert group and taught singing.

== Recordings, film and television ==
Palmer sang the same roles in the D'Oyly Carte television production of Patience (1965), the animated film version of Ruddigore (1966) and the 1967 film version of The Mikado. In 2000 she appeared in the documentary Together Again: A Tribute to Kenneth Sandford, John Reed, and Thomas Round.

In D'Oyly Carte recordings, she sang her usual roles in Princess Ida (1965), Pirates (1968) and Pinafore (1971). She also sang Lady Sangazure in the company's recording of The Sorcerer, a role that she never played on stage. She participated on two D'Oyly Carte highlights discs, A Gilbert and Sullivan Spectacular in 1965, and Songs and Snatches in 1970.
