= Disley Jones =

Clifford Disley Jones (15 January 1926 – 4 June 2005) was an English stage and film designer.

== Life ==
Jones was born in Burton upon Trent, Staffordshire, and left his private school after the failure of his father's timber business. He began work as a window dresser at 16 and took classes in engineering draughtsmanship. Harsh living conditions during World War II, and a hard winter in 1942 led to Jones suffering from double pneumonia. His illness led to him leading an open air life, working in farming made him exempt from military service when he came of age.

=== Stage designer ===
Jones first entered the theatre as a member of an amateur dramatics society. His brother was already working as a music hall illusionist.

In the 1940s the designer at the Players' Theatre, in London, Reginald Woolley, hired Jones as an assistant and taught him the fundamentals of scenic design, as well as painting and construction. Jones designed his first production, Twelfth Night, for the Midland Theatre Company at the College Theatre in Coventry. Jones also designed for several repertory theatres around the United Kingdom as well as the Oxford Playhouse and Bristol Old Vic. He designed his first production in London, The Seagull, at the Arts Theatre in 1953. He was also responsible for two early productions by Peter Hall, The Impresario From Smyrna and Listen to the Wind. Jones also designed Hall's 1954 production of Gigi at the New Theatre.

Jones's partner, Reginald Cornish, had become the manager of the Hammersmith's Lyric Theatre in the 1950s, and Jones joined him there, designing The Dock Brief, What Shall We Tell Caroline? and Share My Lettuce in 1958, and The Demon Barber in 1959. Comedian Kenneth Williams appeared in Share My Lettuce, and was dismissive of Jones in his diary, writing "Disley Jones charged Bamber Gascoigne with subversion, and ordered him out of the theatre. What an incredible lot of amateurs I am among! What a crock of shit". While at the Lyric, Eleanor Fazan and Jones collaborated on the revue One to Another, persuading Bamber Gascoigne, John Mortimer and Harold Pinter to write lyrics for it. Jones had previously worked with Pinter on Pinter's play, The Birthday Party.

Musicals Jones worked on included Anthony Newley's The Good Old Bad Old Days and Dan Farson's Nights at the Comedy.

The first television production designed by Jones was All Summer Long, in 1960. Other TV productions designed by Disley included The Rehearsal, Summer's Pride, and The Teachers.

Jones also worked internationally, designing Rhinoceros for the National Theatre of Iceland, as well as The Rivals and Romeo and Juliet for the Aarhus Theatre, in Denmark. Jones worked as a film production designer from the mid-1960s, working on The Long Day's Dying (1968), The Italian Job (1969), The Revolutionary (1970) and Murphy's War (1971). For the scene involving the Italian mafia on the mountainside in The Italian Job Jones recruited the "prettiest" men as extras from Turin's gay clubs. He had previously designed a production of The Mikado for the D'Oyly Carte Opera Company at the Savoy Theatre, and was subsequently production designer on the 1966 film version of that comic opera. He also worked on the 1972 horror film Tower Of Evil, starring Robin Askwith.

=== Final years ===
Jones ran Them and Theirs, a shop in St Christopher's Place, off London's Oxford Street, which sold commemorative ceramics and picture postcards. Jones had always been a collector of memorabilia and art works.

In the mid-1990s Jones succeeded the late Reginald Woolley, as the resident designer of the Players' Theatre. He redesigned the space under Charing Cross Bridge, and his annual Victorian Christmas pantomimes became notable.

Soon after quitting the Players, he was diagnosed with AIDS. He was stoic upon his AIDS diagnosis, saying "You can hardly be surprised, the way I've carried on." Jones benefitted from treatment, and returned to work, conceiving imaginative projects for films and plays, of which none were brought to fruition.

Jones' partner for almost forty years was Reginald Cornish, who he met at the College Theatre in Coventry. There were together until Cornish's death in 1985. They moved to Spain in the mid-1970s, due to Cornish's health, and ran a restaurant called the Wide-Mouthed Frog in Estepona on the Costa del Sol. The restaurant attracted many of Jones's friends from showbusiness. Jones returned to the United Kingdom following Cornish's death.

Jones was a regular in the French House pub in Soho, and his photograph is a fixture on the walls of the pub. His obituary in The Guardian described the lifestyle of his last years as "...despite no visible means of support apart from his state pension, somehow managed to live with an air of grand extravagance. Only three days before his sudden death, he had returned from a holiday in the south of France, short of cash but full of new ideas." Disley spent his last years in Kennington, in sheltered housing where he planted a garden, and threw parties for his fellow-residents. Of his demeanour the Guardian said "Tall, unintentionally overbearing, loud- spoken and fruity in vocabulary, he was a handful".
