= The Mikado (1967 film) =

- DVD case featuring Valerie Masterson as Yum-Yum
- Directed by: Stuart Burge
- Based on: The Mikado by W.S. Gilbert; Arthur Sullivan
- Produced by: John Brabourne; Anthony Havelock-Allan; Richard B. Goodwin
- Starring: Valerie Masterson; John Reed; Kenneth Sandford; Donald Adams; Philip Potter
- Cinematography: Gerry Fisher
- Edited by: Alma Godfrey
- Music by: Arthur Sullivan
- Production company: BHE Films
- Distributed by: Warner Bros. Pictures (United States)
- Release date: 15 March 1967 (United States)
- Running time: 122 minutes
- Country: United Kingdom
- Language: English

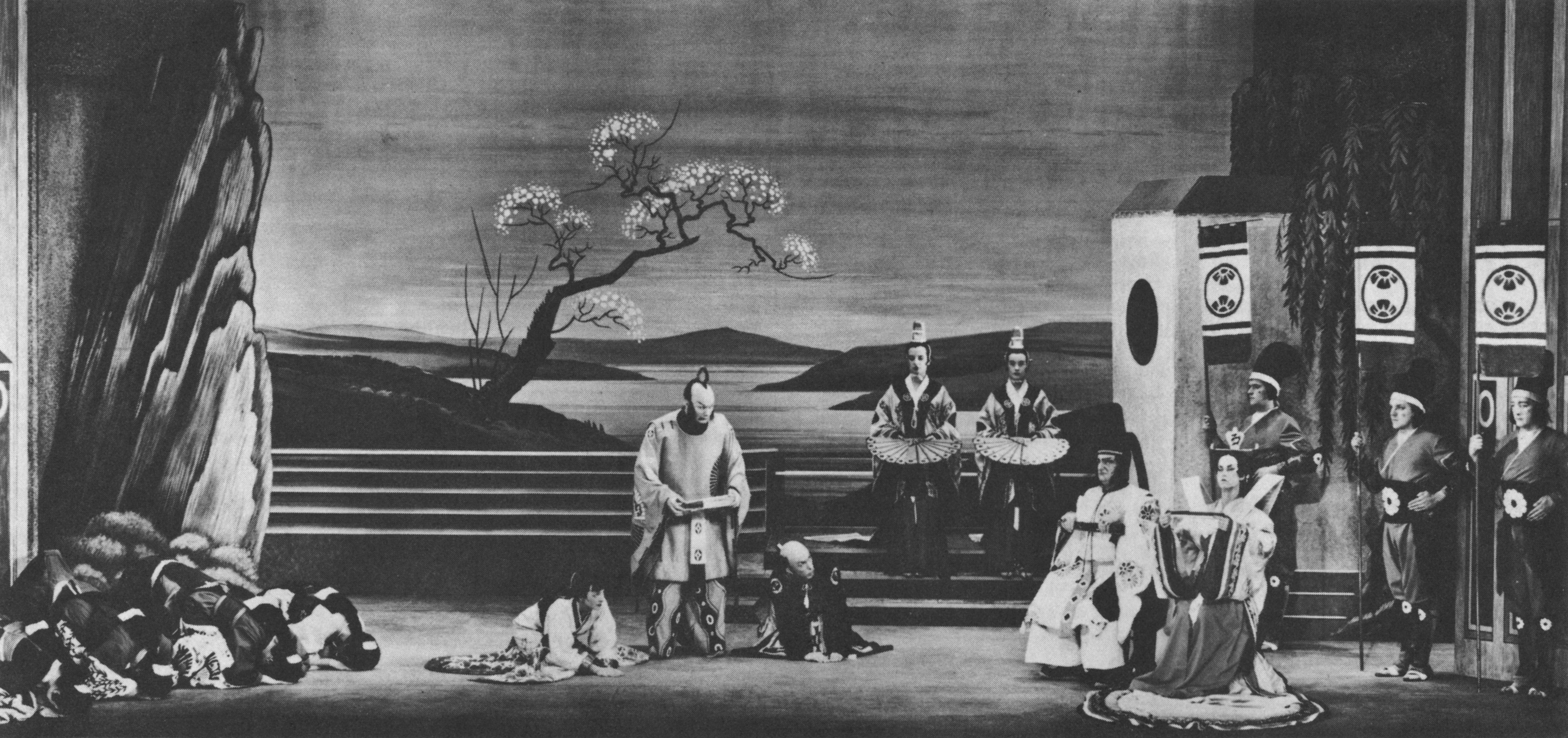
The 1967 film version of The Mikado was based on the D'Oyly Carte Opera Company's contemporary production (pictured).

The Mikado is a 1967 British musical film adaptation of Gilbert and Sullivan's 1885 comic opera of the same name. The film was directed by Stuart Burge and was a slightly edited adaptation of the D'Oyly Carte Opera Company's production of The Mikado and used all D'Oyly Carte singers.

== Plot ==
In Japan, Nanki-Poo, a young and apparently poor "wand'ring minstrel", arrives at the seaside town of Titipu in search of a schoolgirl named Yum-Yum, to profess his love for her after hearing that her guardian, a cheap tailor named Ko-Ko, was to be executed for an act of flirting. The aristocratic mayor of Titipu, Pooh-Bah, and his deputy, Pish-Tush, tell Nanki-Poo that the charges against Ko-Ko were dropped at the last moment, as he was made "Lord High Executioner" to protect others in town accused of the same crime.

Yum-Yum and her sisters, Pitti-Sing and Peep-Bo, return home from school. Nanki-Poo wants to meet Yum-Yum in person, but Ko-Ko sends him away. Pooh-Bah does not find Yum-Yum and her classmates respectful enough. Later, Nanki-Poo, reveals to Yum-Yum that he is the son of the Mikado, the Emperor of Japan, and also that the Mikado has ordered Nanki-Poo to marry an elderly court lady named Katisha, or "perish ignominiously on the scaffold", and so he fled his home disguised as a minstrel. Nanki-Poo and Yum-Yum lament that capital punishment is the penalty for flirting.

Ko-Ko receives a letter from the Mikado containing a decree that unless an execution is carried out in Titipu within a month, the town will be reduced to the rank of a village, which would bring "irretrievable ruin". After a discussion with Pooh-Bah and Pish-Tush, Ko-Ko finds Nanki-Poo planning to commit suicide by hanging himself due to losing Yum-Yum. Ko-Ko persuades him, instead, to be executed for the good of the town and agrees that during the ensuing month, Nanki-Poo may marry Yum-Yum. Before the wedding, a furious Katisha storms into Titipu to expose Nanki-Poo's true identity. Pitti-Sing, Yum-Yum and the townspeople thwart Katisha, who leaves vowing to return with the Mikado.

As Nanki-Poo and Yum-Yum prepare for their wedding, Ko-Ko informs them of a twist in the law that states that when a married man is beheaded, his widow must be buried alive. Ko-Ko urges them to leave Titipu immediately before the Mikado arrives, while he makes a false affidavit in evidence of their fictitious execution; Nanki-Poo and Yum-Yum prepare to leave, to be secretly married by Pooh-Bah.

The Mikado arrives with Katisha in search of Nanki-Poo. The Mikado reads in the affidavit that Nanki-Poo has been executed for flirting. Katisha insists that Ko-Ko, along with Pitti-Sing and Pooh-Bah, should be executed for killing the Mikado's heir apparent, but the Mikado suggests they should wait until after lunch before executing the three.

Nanki-Poo points out that if Ko-Ko can persuade Katisha to marry Ko-Ko, she will no longer have any claim on Nanki Poo. In that case, Nanki Poo can reveal to his father that he is still alive, and all will end well. Ko-Ko tells Katisha a story about a bird who died of heartbreak, and Katisha is so moved that she accepts his hand in marriage. Katisha pleads for the Mikado to spare the lives of her new husband, Ko-Ko, and his two friends. Nanki-Poo then reveals himself and his new wife to his father, much to Katisha's disgrace. Ko-Ko argues that since the Mikado had ordered that an execution take place in Titipu, it was "as good as done ... and why not say so?" The Mikado finds great humour in this and pardons everyone, amid much rejoicing.

== Cast ==
- John Reed as Ko-Ko
- Kenneth Sandford as Pooh-Bah
- Donald Adams as the Mikado
- Valerie Masterson as Yum-Yum
- Philip Potter as Nanki-Poo
- Christene Palmer as Katisha
- Peggy Ann Jones as Pitti-Sing
- Thomas Lawlor as Pish-Tush
- Pauline Wales as Peep-Bo
- George Cook as Go-To

Source: British Film Institute.

== Production ==
The 1966 production of The Mikado by the D'Oyly Carte Opera Company was adapted by the director Stuart Burge, who had previously adapted films based on such theatre productions as Uncle Vanya (1963) and Laurence Olivier's National Theatre version of Othello (1965). The direction of the film closely reflects the D'Oyly Carte staging of the time by Anthony Besch, although there are some cuts.

The Mikado was filmed at the Golders Green Hippodrome on enlarged stage sets in the same way that Burge had filmed Othello. It starred John Reed, Kenneth Sandford, Valerie Masterson, Philip Potter, Donald Adams, Christene Palmer and Peggy Ann Jones in their usual roles with D'Oyly Carte, and used the D'Oyly Carte chorus. The City of Birmingham Symphony Orchestra was conducted by D'Oyly Carte's longstanding conductor, Isidore Godfrey. Set design and decoration were by Disley Jones and Peter Howitt. With one exception the costumes were by Charles Ricketts, first seen in D'Oyly Carte stage productions in 1926 and retained by subsequent D'Oyly Carte designers. The first of Nanki-Poo's two costumes was by Jones.

== Release ==
The Mikado was released in the United States on 15 March 1967. The British premiere was at the Queen Elizabeth Hall in London, on 17 July 1967. The film has been released on DVD in Britain and the US. Two vinyl releases of audio for songs from the film were recorded in 1965.

== Reception ==
In The Illustrated London News Alan Dent commented that the film confirmed his growing view that opera – particularly comic opera – could not be satisfactorily filmed: "I miss the theatre, the laughter … the interruptions of applause, even the encores". The New York Times criticised the filming technique and the orchestra and noted, "Knowing how fine this cast can be in its proper medium, one regrets the impression this Mikado will make on those not fortunate enough to have watched the company in the flesh. The cameras have captured everything about the company's acting except its magic." Scholar Marc Shepherd commented in 2009 that "the performance is extremely flat. One senses that the cast, lacking a live audience to interact with, are merely going through the motions." In 2017 the BBC's reviewer in a comparative survey of all available recordings of The Mikado chose the DVD of the 1966 film in preference to all other recordings except for Sir Charles Mackerras's 1992 CD version, calling the D'Oyly Carte set "a tribute to a fine theatrical tradition caught at its most appealing".

== See also ==
- List of British films of 1967

== Sources ==
- Bettany, Clemence (1975). The D'Oyly Carte Centenary Book. London: D'Oyly Carte Opera Company. OCLC 910206945.
- Bradley, Ian (2005). Oh Joy! Oh Rapture! The Enduring Phenomenon of Gilbert and Sullivan. Oxford: Oxford University Press. ISBN 978-0-19-516700-9.
