= Close House, County Durham =

Village in County Durham, England

Coordinates: 54.648°N 1.641°W

Close House
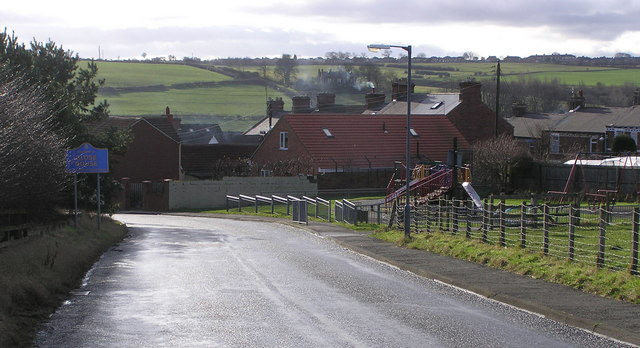
- Entering Close House

- Location within County Durham
- OS grid reference: NZ2327
- Unitary authority: County Durham
- Ceremonial county: County Durham
- Region: North East
- Country: England
- Sovereign state: United Kingdom
- Post town: BISHOP AUCKLAND
- Postcode district: DL14
- Dialling code: 01388
- Police: Durham
- Fire: County Durham and Darlington
- Ambulance: North East
- UK Parliament: Bishop Auckland

Close House is a village in County Durham, England. It is situated a short distance to the north of Shildon, near to Eldon and Coundon Grange. In the 2001 census Close House had a population of 296.

The famed Gilbert and Sullivan star John Reed was born here in 1916.
