= Peggy Ann Jones =

English opera singer and actress (1939–2024)

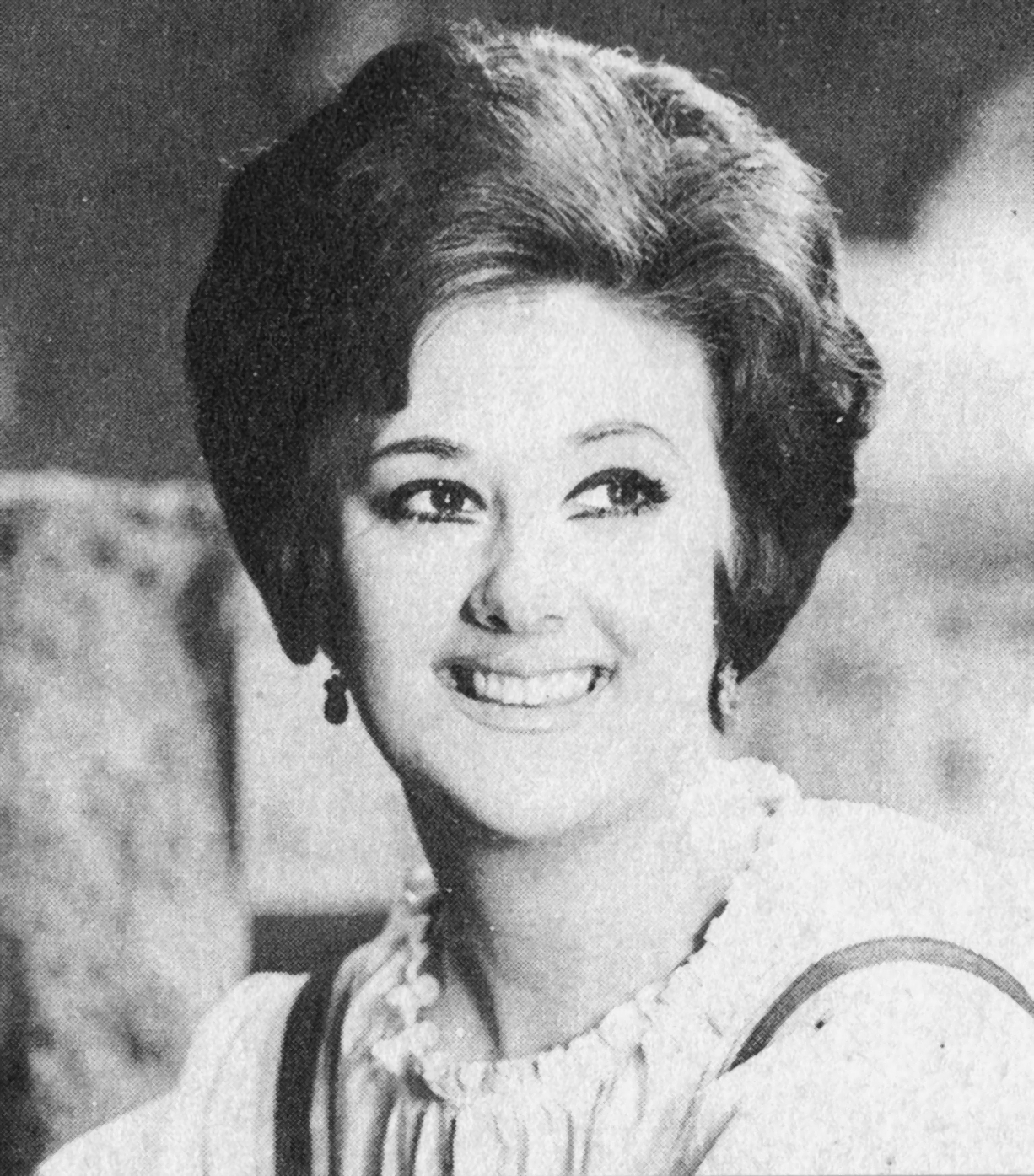
Jones in 1962

Peggy Ann Jones (22 January 1939 – 24 November 2024) was an English opera singer and actress, best known for her performances in the mezzo-soprano roles of the Savoy operas with the D'Oyly Carte Opera Company. During a fifteen-year career with that company, beginning at age 19, she was particularly known for her interpretations of the title role in Iolanthe, Pitti-Sing in The Mikado, Phoebe Meryll in The Yeomen of the Guard, and Mad Margaret in Ruddigore. She later performed on television, in films and in musicals in London's West End. Jones's best-known recordings include the role of Pitti-Sing on both the 1973 D'Oyly Carte recording and 1966 film version of The Mikado.

== Life and career ==
Jones was born on 22 January 1939, in Newark, Nottinghamshire, England, where she was raised. Beginning at an early age, she studied the piano. She took diplomas in dress design, interior design and architecture. While continuing her musical studies, she briefly worked for a bank. Jones performed in amateur dramatics as a teenager, playing the title role in Rose-Marie at the age of 16. She also appeared in The White Horse Inn and A Country Girl and won prizes at the Nottingham Festival.

Jones joined the D'Oyly Carte Opera Company in 1958 at the age of 19. She began in the chorus and, in 1960, began playing the small roles Peep-Bo in The Mikado and Ruth in Ruddigore, as well as occasionally substituting as Phoebe Meryll in The Yeomen of the Guard, Tessa in The Gondoliers and Fleta in Iolanthe. The next season, she added to her regular repertoire Lady Saphir in Patience. In 1962, Jones became one of the company's principal mezzo-sopranos, playing Phoebe and Tessa, as well as Peep-Bo and Kate in The Pirates of Penzance. She also occasionally played the title role in Iolanthe. The next year, she was given two more principal roles, Mad Margaret, in the company's new production of Ruddigore, and Pitti-Sing in The Mikado, giving up the role of Tessa, which, however, she continued to play occasionally. She also substituted from time to time as Lady Angela in Patience.

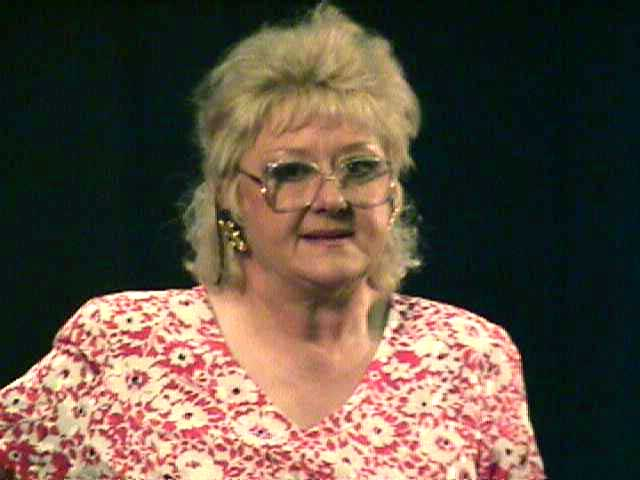
Jones in 1998

Beginning in 1965, Jones regularly played Edith in Pirates, Lady Angela in Patience, the title role in Iolanthe, Pitti-Sing, Margaret and Phoebe. The Times praised her singing and portrayal of Margaret in Ruddigore. In 1971, Jones also took on the character role of Mrs. Partlett in the company's new production of The Sorcerer. She left the D'Oyly Carte company in 1973 in ill health.

She later appeared on BBC2 in a Mantovani Show of the Week and in The Adventure of Sherlock Holmes' Smarter Brother, starring with Gene Wilder (1975). This was followed by several West End musicals, including the stage adaptation of Dad's Army in 1975–1976, the 1976 musical adaptation of Liza of Lambeth, the 1977 stage adaptation of The Point!, The Phantom of the Opera as the Wardrobe Mistress/Confidante (1986–1988), Beethoven's Tenth, and Evita. She also appeared in the British provinces in productions of Born Again by Julian Barry (1990), Fiddler on the Roof, and Oliver! (as Mrs. Bumble). Television and film credits include The Sweeney (1978; the final episode: "Jack or Knave"), The Strange Affair of Adelaide Harris (1979), Play for Today (1979; Episode: "Billy"), Bless Me Father (1981), BBC2 Playhouse (1982; Episode: "Aubrey"), Grange Hill (1983; two episodes), Mitch (1984), The Bill (1990) and Prisoner of Honor (1991). She also appeared in nearly three dozen television commercials.

In later years, Jones appeared frequently at the International Gilbert and Sullivan Festival giving talks, master classes and performances. In 1995 at the festival, she "was a wonderfully comic Mrs. Partlet" in The Sorcerer. She loved dogs, drawing and do-it-yourself projects and enjoyed cooking, history and art. She also had an interest in filmmaking and made several films using D'Oyly Carte actors.

Jones died on 24 November 2024, at the age of 85.

== Recordings ==
Her recordings with D'Oyly Carte Opera Company included Lady Angela in their BBC2 television broadcast of Patience in 1965, excerpts of Pitti-Sing on their 1965 album A Gilbert and Sullivan Spectacular, an excerpt of Phoebe on their 1970 album Songs and Snatches, and Pitti-Sing in 1973. She also played Pitti-Sing in the company's 1966 film version of The Mikado. She lent her voice to the role of Mad Margaret in the animated 1967 Halas & Batchelor Ruddigore. The Gilbert and Sullivan Discography notes, "The role of Lady Angela is a revelation as performed by Peggy Ann Jones. Her comic timing is flawless." Sounds on CD released Tète à Tète, a two-hour long recording, from sessions from the 1970s, of Jones reminiscing with her friend and fellow D'Oyly Carte performer John Reed.

Jones also appears on the original cast recording of The Phantom of the Opera.
