= John Bush Jones =

American writer and educator (1940–2019)

- Born: August 3, 1940; Chicago, Illinois, U.S.
- Died: December 31, 2019 (aged 79)
- Education: Ph.D., Northwestern University
- Occupations: Educator, Author, Theatre director and critic
- Employer: Brandeis University

John Bush Jones (August 3, 1940 – December 31, 2019) was an American author, theatre director, critic, educator and scholar. He taught theatre for more than two decades at Brandeis University and wrote widely about musical theatre, publishing several books.

== Early life and education ==
Jones was born in Chicago, Illinois in 1940. He described himself as a child of the World War II home front, having just turned five, eleven days before the Surrender of Japan. His experience influenced his writing career, and is reflected in his books.

"my sensory memories great and small of my life on my own home front of Chicago's North Shore suburbs have remained a part if me ever since ... a formation of bombers passed low over my house, opened their bomb bay doors, and dropped thousands of colored handbills featuring the familiar logo of the Minute Man and the equally famous "'BUY WAR BONDS!"'

— John Bush Jones, Victory: Magazine Advertising and the World War II Home Front, Preface

He received an undergraduate degree in speech (theatre) from Northwestern University in 1962. He earned his Ph.D. from Northwestern in 1970. Jones married Sandra Pirie Carson, whose family commissioned architect Louis Sullivan to design the Carson Pirie Scott & Co. store in downtown Chicago. They were married for 10 years before divorcing and had one son, Aaron Carson.

== Career ==
Jones reviewed drama for the Kansas City Star and taught English at the University of Kansas before joining the faculty at Brandeis University in 1978, in the Theater Arts Department. He received the 1995–1996 Louis Dembitz Brandeis Prize for Excellence in Teaching.

At Brandeis, Jones served on the organizing committee for many years of the Kennedy Center American College Theater Festival. He directed numerous plays and musicals both at Brandeis and in professional theatre, including Ruddigore, Uncommon Women and Others and She Loves Me. He retired from Brandeis in 2001.

== Bibliography ==
Jones wrote several books and many articles. He wrote theatre criticism for several newspapers and magazines. His published books and a sampling of articles are listed below.

=== Books ===
- Jones, John Bush (1970). W. S. Gilbert: a Century of Scholarship and Commentary. New York University Press. ISBN 978-0-8147-0464-6. OCLC 123923.
- Jones, John Bush (1974). Readings in Descriptive Bibliography. Kent State University Press. ISBN 978-0-87338-153-6. OCLC 185542141.
- Jones, John Bush (2011). Our Musicals, Ourselves: A Social History of the American Musical Theatre. Brandeis University Press. ISBN 978-1-61168-223-6.
- Jones, John Bush (2006). The Songs that Fought the War: Popular Music and the Home Front, 1939-1945. UPNE. ISBN 978-1-58465-443-8.
- Jones, John Bush (2009). All-Out for Victory!: Magazine Advertising and the World War II Home Front. UPNE. ISBN 978-1-58465-833-7.
- Jones, John Bush (2015). Reinventing Dixie: Tin Pan Alley's Songs and the Creation of the Mythic South. LSU Press. ISBN 978-0-8071-5944-6. OCLC 894313622.

=== Articles ===
- Jones, John Bush (1974). Mr. Gilbert and Dr. Bowdler: a further note on Patience. OCLC 757110190.
- Jones, John Bush (December 1967). "The Printing of 'The Grand Duke': Notes Toward a Gilbert Bibliography". The Papers of the Bibliographical Society of America. 61 (4): 335–342. doi:10.1086/pbsa.61.4.24300954. OCLC 1186193239. S2CID 163565866.
- Jones, John Bush (May 1976). "Editing Victorian Playwrights: Some Problems, Priorities, and Principles". Theatre Survey. 17 (1): 106–123. doi:10.1017/S0040557400004245. S2CID 162685333.
- Jones, John Bush (1976). British printers on galley proofs: a chronological reconsideration. London: O.U.P. OCLC 931340734.
- Jones, John Bush (March 1977). "Victorian 'Readers' and Modern Editors: Attitudes and Accidentals Revisited". The Papers of the Bibliographical Society of America. 71 (1): 49–59. doi:10.1086/pbsa.71.1.24302323. OCLC 1185493410. S2CID 163772620.
- Jones, John Bush (1991). "From Melodrama to Tragedy: The Transformation of Sweeney Todd". New England Theatre Journal. 2 (1): 85–97. ProQuest 229998568.

An archive of Jones' works is available at the Robert D. Farber University Archives and Special Collections Department, Brandeis University Libraries.

== Sources ==
- Jones, John Bush (2004). Our Musicals, Ourselves: A Social History of the American Musical Theatre. Brandeis University Press. ISBN 978-1-61168-223-6.
- Jones, John Bush (2009). All-Out for Victory!: Magazine Advertising and the World War II Home Front. UPNE. ISBN 978-1-58465-833-7.
