= Uncle Vanya (1963 film) =

- Directed by: Laurence Olivier; Stuart Burge
- Written by: Anton Chekhov; Constance Garnett
- Starring: Michael Redgrave; Laurence Olivier; Joan Plowright; Sybil Thorndike; Rosemary Harris
- Music by: Alexis Chesnakov
- Production company: BHE Films
- Distributed by: Arthur Cantor Films
- Release date: 20 November 1963 (UK)
- Running time: 120 minutes
- Country: United Kingdom
- Language: English

Uncle Vanya is a 1963 British film adaptation of the 1899 play Uncle Vanya by Anton Chekhov. The film was directed by Laurence Olivier and Stuart Burge. It was a filmed version of the Chichester Festival Theatre production, starring Laurence Olivier as Astrov, Michael Redgrave as (Vanya), Rosemary Harris as (Elena), and Joan Plowright as (Sonya).

== Cast ==
- Max Adrian as Professor Aleksandr Vladimirovich Serebryakov
- Sir Lewis Casson as Ilya Ilych Telegin
- Fay Compton as Mariya Vasilyevna Voynitsky
- Rosemary Harris as Helena (Yelena) Andreyevna Serebryakov
- Robert Lang as Yefim
- Laurence Olivier as Dr. Mikhail Lvovich Astrov
- Joan Plowright as Sofia "Sonya" Alexandrovna Serebryakov
- Sir Michael Redgrave as Ivan Petrovich ("Uncle Vanya") Voynitsky
- Dame Sybil Thorndike as Marina Timofeevna

== Reception ==
Harold Hobson of the Sunday Times described the production as "the admitted master achievement in British twentieth-century theatre", while The New Yorker called it "probably the best 'Vanya' in English we shall ever see".
