= Rats, Bats and Vats series =

Series of science-fiction novels

The Rats, Bats and Vats series is two humorous science-fiction novels written by Eric Flint and Dave Freer. The books are Rats, Bats and Vats (2000) and its direct sequel The Rats, the Bats and the Ugly (2004). The short story prequel "Genie out of the Bottle" was published in Cosmic Tales of Adventure II (2005).

== Background ==
The novels are set on the planet of Harmony And Reason (HAR), settled by a slowship from twenty-second century Earth. The planet has been set up under the ideals of the New Fabian Society, "Responsible socialism," with social-political power linked to ownership of shares in the company. The colony is not very old, no more than two-three generations, and the total population is small (there is only one major settlement—George Bernard Shaw City), leading to the use of clones, known as "'Vats", created from tissue samples brought from Earth. This has led to the stratification of society between shareholders and the much more numerous debt-ridden vats—the debt arising from the charges for being grown, raised and educated,

Onto this planet have arrived the sea urchin like Korozhet who warn of an impending invasion by another alien species, the Magh. The novels are set a few years after the war has begun, with the Magh invasion proceeding slowly but towards inevitable human defeat.

HAR has an uneven technology base, manufacturing has settled on a level varying between the late nineteenth to early twentieth century, but the colonists also have the cloning equipment and a nucleus of 22nd century technology centered around the remains of the enormous slowship. The Korozhet have sold the HAR army two major technologies—slowshields and soft-cyber (cybernetic enhancement chips).

Slowshields, as the name suggests, are light-weight full-body forcefields that 'harden' when impacted by high-velocity impacts (greater than 22.8 mph) but are flexible the rest of the time—this has changed the war against the Magh' into grinding defensive close combat.

The soft-cyber makes stupid creatures smarter. These "uplifted" animals can be made to think and speak, and brain-damaged humans can be changed so their IQ matches their physical age, although using soft-cyber on humans is generally unknown on HAR. To augment the unavoidably small human army of vat conscripts the HAR technicians have genetically engineered and then uplifted two species to fight alongside them—rats and bats. Both are effective fighters but are not, perhaps, the most well-designed beings.

The rats are about the size of a small cats, mixing genes from the elephant shrew, with add-ons from real shrews and rats. With soft-cyber implants and vocal synthesizers they can fight alongside human troops. Their personalities are a mix of rat characteristics, the contents of their vocabulary ROM ("Shakespeare plays, Gilbert and Sullivan and... a reading of Steinbeck's Sweet Thursday"), and the driving pressures of their extremely high metabolic rates.

The bats were made after the rats, as an attempt to create "more heroic and idealistic helpers for mankind's war." Because of this their ROM contains "Irish revolutionary songs and old "Wobbly" tunes". They are more courageous than the rats but are also natural revolutionaries.

== The Stories ==
The books focus on a single 'military' action and then its consequences. The scene moves between numerous characters, but there are some obvious heroes. The first, a group of one human, five bats, and seven rats; the second being the daughter of the Chief Executive Shareholder and her uplifted galago; the third one, an idealistic if intimidating MI major and his rattess aide; finally "And a large supporting cast, numbering in millions for the greatest production off Earth!"

Rats, Bats and Vats is centered on the one human, five bats, and seven rats. All soldiers, they are trapped behind Magh' lines during an assault—a situation that is universally terminal. They survive, cause considerable damage to the Magh', drink and eat considerably, and uncover some surprising secrets. On the human side they are aided by "the very model of a modern major" Fitzhugh and his colleagues, who grasp the opportunity created by the marauding group to fashion the first human victory in the war against the Magh'—despite the best efforts of the General Staff to 'snatch defeat'.

The Rats, the Bats and the Ugly deals with the consequences of ignoring the military chain of command, that is court martial, and the attempts to either reveal or cover-up the surprising secrets of the first book.
