= George Cook (opera singer) =

English opera singer and actor

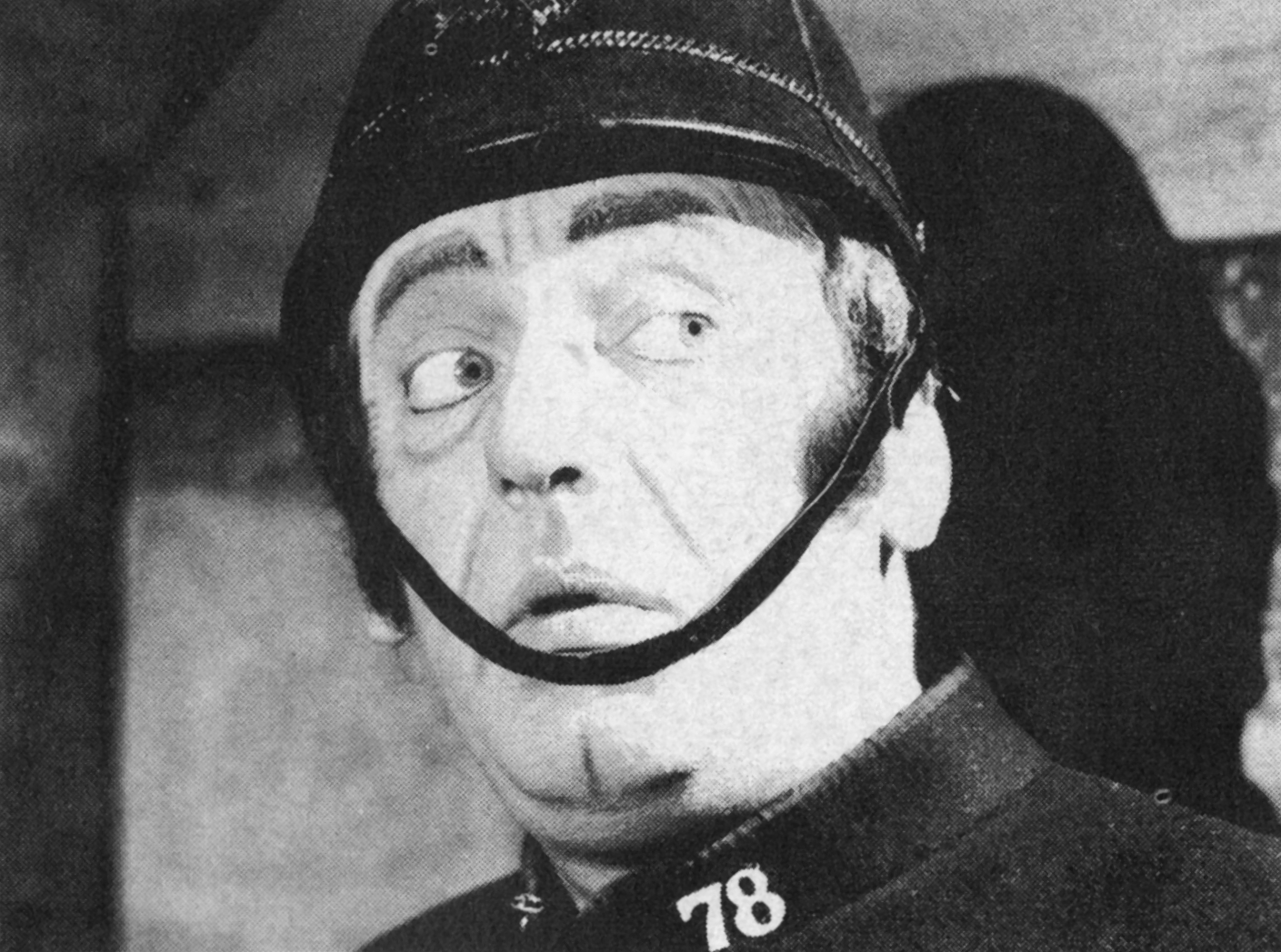
Cook as the Sergeant of Police in The Pirates of Penzance

George Cook (28 May 1925 – April 1995) was an English opera singer and actor, best known for his performances in the bass and bass-baritone roles of the Savoy Operas with the D'Oyly Carte Opera Company.

== Life and career ==
George Cook was born in Coventry. Upon his discharge from the Royal Navy at the close of World War II, Cook joined an amateur operatic society in Coventry. Encouraged by his success, he moved to London and studied voice.

Cook joined the D'Oyly Carte Opera Company chorus in 1954, soon assuming the role of the Carpenter's Mate in H.M.S. Pinafore. In 1955, he also began to play the mute role of the Associate in Trial by Jury. Beginning in 1956, he added to his repertory the roles of Sergeant Bouncer in Cox and Box, the Usher in Trial, the Boatswain's Mate in Pinafore, and Samuel in The Pirates of Penzance.

In 1956 Cook began to play the role of Giorgio in The Gondoliers, while also serving as understudy for the principal baritone roles. He also took on the role of Scynthius in Princess Ida in 1957, and the roles of Go-To in The Mikado and Sergeant of Police in Pirates in 1962. Finally, in 1963, he added the role of Old Adam in Ruddigore. He regularly played these roles until he left the D'Oyly Carte organisation in 1969, after marrying D'Oyly Carte chorister Marian Martin.

In addition, as understudy to Kenneth Sandford, he often played Private Willis in Iolanthe, King Hildebrand in Princess Ida, Pooh-Bah in The Mikado, Sir Despard Murgatroyd in Ruddigore, Wilfred Shadbolt in The Yeomen of the Guard, and Don Alhambra in The Gondoliers.

Cook was also known for crafting the Japanese-style fans used by D'Oyly Carte and numerous amateur G&S societies for productions of The Mikado throughout the UK and abroad. After leaving D'Oyly Carte, Cook sang with Gilbert and Sullivan for All in his spare time. His wife joined the English National Opera chorus in 1984 and sang with that company for 13 years, into her 60s.

== Recordings ==
Cook's roles recorded with D'Oyly Carte include the Boatswain in Pinafore (1960), Giorgio in The Gondoliers (1961), Scynthius in Princess Ida (1965), and Samuel in Pirates (1968). He is also Go-To in the 1966 film version of The Mikado and provides the voice of Old Adam in the 1967 Halas and Batchelor cartoon of Ruddigore.
