= John Reed (actor) =

English actor, singer and dancer

John Reed in 1978

John Lamb Reed OBE (13 February 1916 – 13 February 2010) was an English actor, dancer and singer, known for his nimble performances in the principal comic roles of the Savoy Operas, particularly with the D'Oyly Carte Opera Company. Reed has been called "the last great exponent" of the Gilbert and Sullivan comedy roles.

The son of a butcher from County Durham, Reed began performing at the end of World War II, joining the D'Oyly Carte Opera Company in 1951. After eight years as understudy to Peter Pratt, he became the principal comedian of the company in 1959, remaining for two decades, playing all the famous Gilbert and Sullivan patter roles, including Sir Joseph in H.M.S. Pinafore, the Major-General in The Pirates of Penzance, Bunthorne in Patience, the Lord Chancellor in Iolanthe, Ko-Ko in The Mikado, Jack Point in The Yeomen of the Guard and the Duke of Plaza-Toro in The Gondoliers, among others. He was known for his "fleet-footed clowning", dry and roguish wit, comic timing, "crystal clear diction" in the patter songs, and his amusing character voice, recording all of his principal roles with the company.

In 1979, Reed left the company but continued performing in and directing Gilbert and Sullivan productions in Britain and America, as well as appearing in other light opera. He retired to Halifax, West Yorkshire, directing amateur Gilbert and Sullivan companies and attending the International Gilbert and Sullivan Festival in Buxton for many years.

== Life and career ==
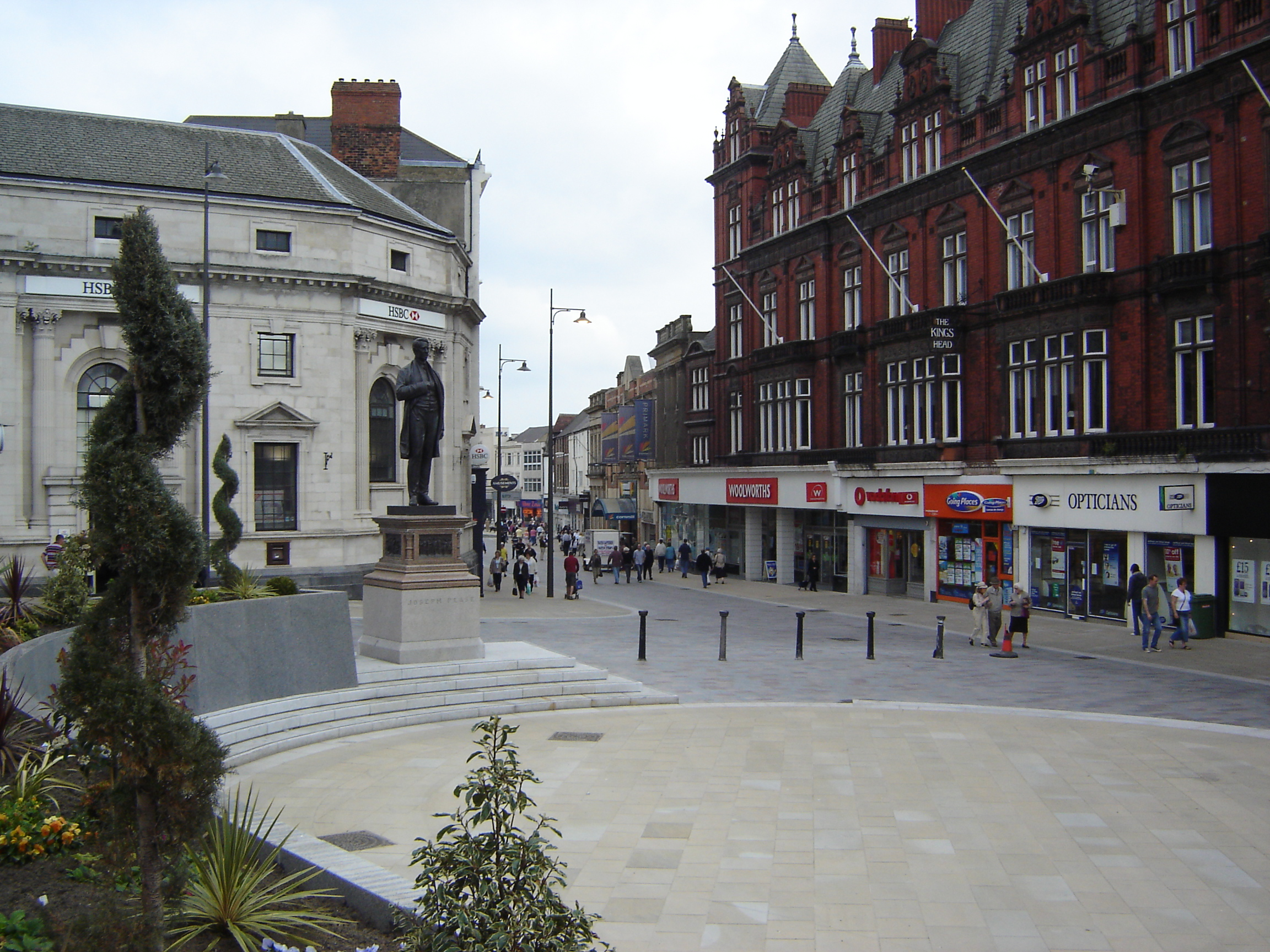
Darlington, where Reed spent most of his youth

Reed was born in the village of Close House, near Bishop Auckland, County Durham, the fourth and youngest child of Robert Elliott Reed, a butcher (b. 1874) and his wife, Elizabeth Ann, nee Bridges (b. 1883) "an excellent amateur soprano who rescued the family finances by opening a successful fish shop" after his father's butcher shop failed. He was named after his grandfather, a Wesleyan Methodist minister. His sisters were Christina (b. 1903), Betty (b. 1905) and Anne "Hannah" Reed Hunter (b. 1912) (a younger brother, Cyril, died in infancy). Reed played the piano as a child. From age eleven, he grew up near the much larger town of Darlington, County Durham. He studied elocution, dancing, singing and mime, but worked in builders' and insurance offices. During World War II, he enlisted in the auxiliary fire service and worked as an instrument maker.

Reed began his theatrical career, after the war, in plays with a repertory theatre company, and as a dancer, winning medals for dance across the North-East of England. When his father became ill, he returned home to work in his father's business, and performed in musical theatre for a number of years with local amateur companies including the Darlington Operatic Society. He was also a director and dance instructor for the Darlington Education Committee.

=== D'Oyly Carte years ===
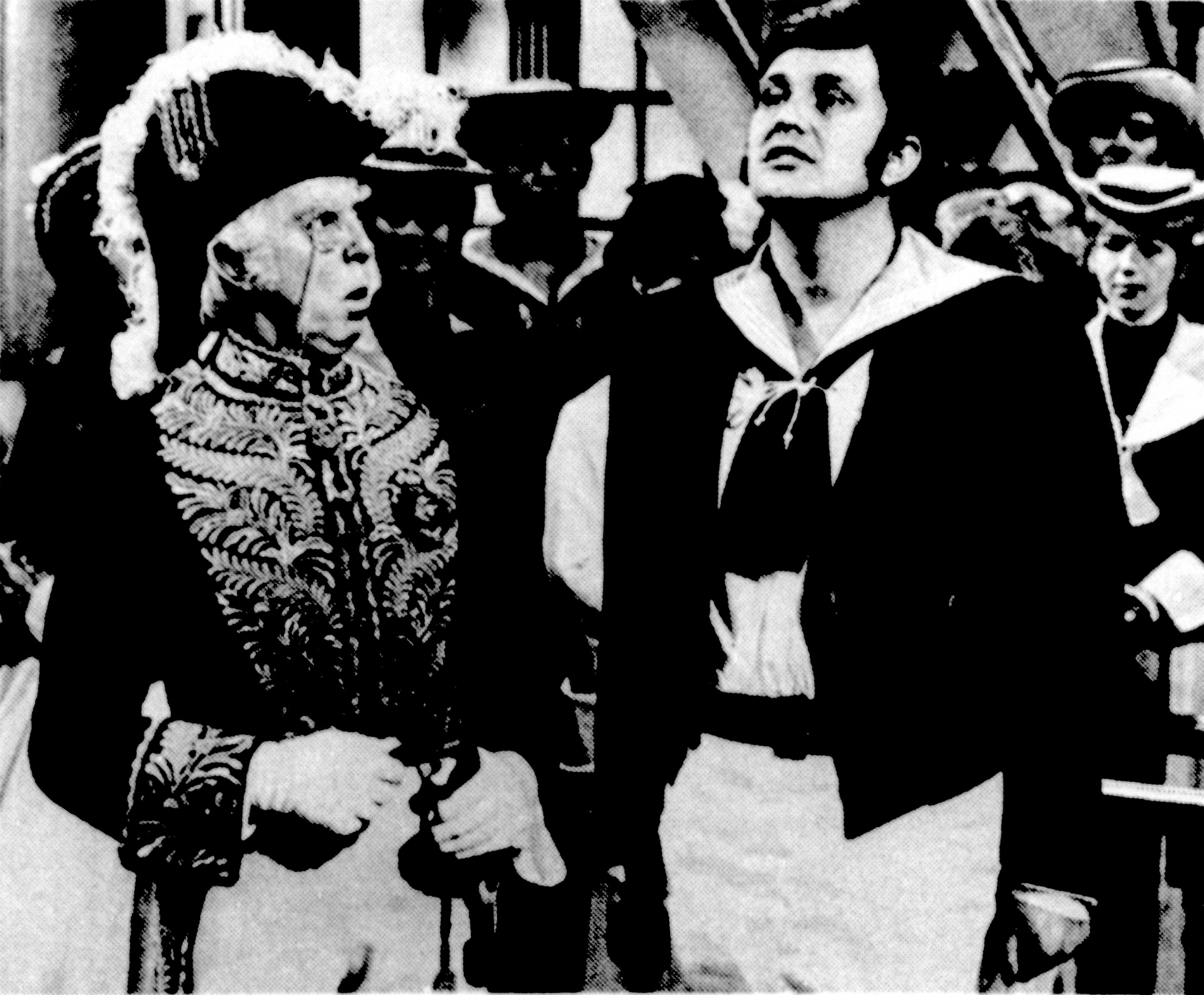
Reed as Sir Joseph Porter in H.M.S. Pinafore opposite Malcolm Williams as Ralph, 1973

Reed joined the D'Oyly Carte Opera Company in 1951 as the understudy to Peter Pratt, who had recently become the principal comedian of the company. At the time of his audition, he knew little or nothing about Gilbert and Sullivan, but the company manager, Frederic Lloyd, assured him that the company preferred this so that they could "start you off in the way we mean you to go". The company performed 48 weeks per year, mostly on tour, usually with winter seasons in London. Reed appeared in the chorus and was given several smaller roles: Associate (1952–55) in Trial by Jury, Major Murgatroyd in Patience (1952–59), Second Citizen in The Yeomen of the Guard (1952–59), Annibale (1952–59) and Antonio (1953–59) in The Gondoliers (a role that took advantage of his dancing skills), and Mr. Cox in Cox and Box (1957–59). He was coached in his own roles and those he understudied by Eleanor Evans. the company's stage director. In 1955, Reed began to play the Learned Judge in Trial. He also substituted for Pratt occasionally, including when Pratt was ill in March and April 1959.

In 1959, when Pratt left the D'Oyly Carte Opera Company, Reed became the last of the company's long-serving principal comedians, remaining in that role for the next twenty years. Writer Andrew Lamb noted that Reed's "nimble dancing, characterful light-baritone singing, and the business he was able to introduce into encores and elsewhere within the generally rigid D'Oyly Carte constraints, soon helped to establish his own loyal following, and the personal rapport he enjoyed with his fans grew to legendary status." During these two decades, his parts were as follows: Sir Joseph Porter in H.M.S. Pinafore, Major-General Stanley in The Pirates of Penzance (a role that he gave up in 1969), Bunthorne in Patience, the Lord Chancellor in Iolanthe, King Gama in Princess Ida, Ko-Ko in The Mikado, Robin Oakapple/Sir Ruthven in Ruddigore, Jack Point in The Yeomen of the Guard, the Duke of Plaza-Toro in The Gondoliers, and John Wellington Wells in The Sorcerer (beginning with the 1971 revival). He dropped from his repertory the role of the Judge in Trial by Jury, in 1959, briefly resuming it for the D'Oyly Carte's centenary celebrations at the Savoy Theatre in 1975. For that season, he also played Scaphio in Utopia, Limited and Grand Duke Rudolph in the company's concert of The Grand Duke. The company had not performed these two works since the original productions in the 1890s. Reed also participated in eleven of the company's overseas tours to North America (eight times), Denmark (1970), Rome (1974) and Australasia (1979).

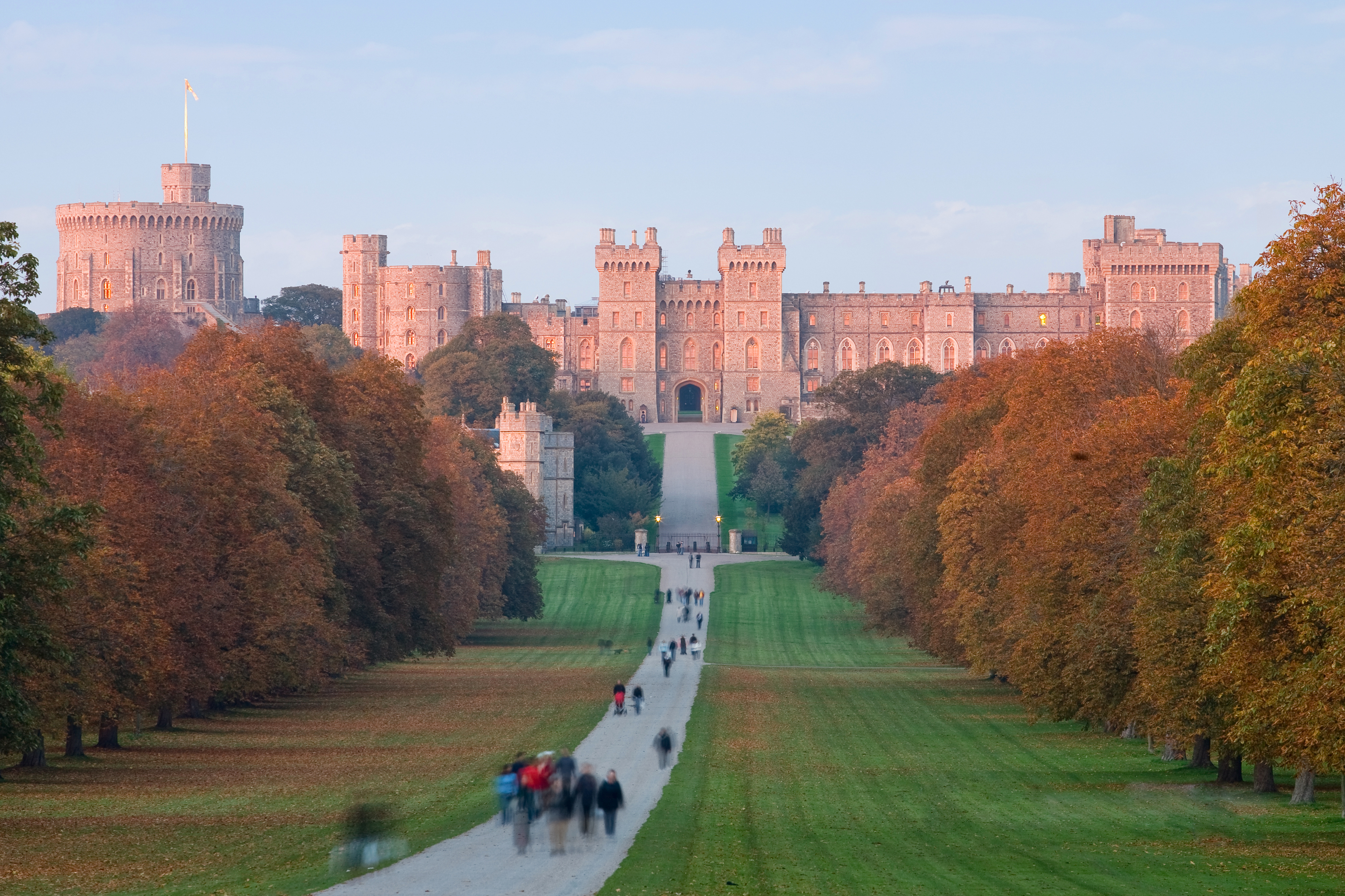
Reed performed at a Jubilee Year Royal Command Performance at Windsor Castle in 1977

In 1977, Reed was honoured as an Officer of the Order of the British Empire (OBE). He played before Queen Elizabeth II and other members of the Royal Family at least eight times, including in 1977 for the queen's Silver Jubilee Command Performance, at Windsor Castle, of H.M.S. Pinafore. Reed told interviewer Colin Prestige that "When the Prince of Wales, aged eleven, saw The Mikado, Ko-Ko afterwards entertained him in the dressing-room." Although Reed loved the family atmosphere of the company during his nearly thirty years there, he later felt that the company's dynamic was changing. He decided to leave the company during the 1979 Australasian tour, and author Ian Bradley relates one of the incidents that served as a tipping point: "At the end of their first rehearsal [in Australia], conductor Fraser Goulding asked the chorus to stay on for a few minutes just to polish the act 2 finale. The Equity representative promptly stood up and said, 'You know that means we'll be going into overtime'. Reed says: ... we used to go on far into the evening working on things to get them right and never thought of overtime. I realized that was the time to go'."

=== Assessment ===
Reed said that, of his roles, he probably loved Ko-Ko the most, noting, "[I]t's such fun to do ... you make people laugh, and the children and everybody enjoy him. And I suppose that's what our job is here anyway. To entertain people." He also commented, "Ko-Ko is almost me. There's a lot of me in the character. It lets me bring out my sense of humour. ... [In] the character parts ... you must get your own personality through." On the other hand, he said, "Something takes over from me when I go on. I become something different. I'm basically shy, and I go and hide behind my characters." Reed also loved to play Jack Point in Yeomen, a tragicomic character. "Jack Point is me in another age – just a strolling player. I really believe I could die of a broken heart". Reed said that every comedian savours the chance to play a role like Point in which "you like to see if you can make 'em cry a little". He also noted that, generally, "I like anything where the dancing comes in". His least favourite role was Major-General Stanley in Pirates, a role that he relinquished in 1969. He also found two drawbacks to playing King Gama: "the heavy make-up ... hid every feature of his face except his eyes, and made it impossible for him to wear his glasses so that he could do his newspaper crossword while waiting to go on". Of the "younger" roles he played even in his later years with the company, Reed said, "I feel I'm so fundamentally a young person. ... I'm older than the part I'm playing, for instance, but I feel young." He loved performing for children and delighted in the gala "last nights" of each London season with the D'Oyly Carte, where he would perform for glittering audiences of "Prime Ministers, Lord Chancellors and First Lords of the Admiralty."

In its obituary, The Guardian asserted: Reed's "comic timing, nimble footwork and clarity of diction made him the acknowledged master of the "patter" roles, at once the most challenging and defining of all Gilbert and Sullivan's creations. His biographer, Cynthia Morey, praised his "feet that hardly seemed to touch the floor as he danced across the stage; the sly glance and raised eyebrow that could bring the house down." The Times called his stage personality "impish", writing: "He was, quite simply, a phenomenon. For 48 gruelling weeks of each of those 20 years he effortlessly negotiated the tongue-twisting patter songs." The latter paper judged Reed a success in his desire to play pathos: "His Jack Point, the lovelorn jester in The Yeomen of the Guard, and the role which he dubbed 'the one apart, the Hamlet of Gilbert and Sullivan', could easily bring a tear to the eye, as did his spoken rendition of 'Iolanthe, thou livest?'"

Of his Ko-Ko, The Times stated, "The brightest performance of the evening comes from Mr. John Reed, a spirited Ko-Ko with exactly the right stature and crystal clear diction". The same paper commented, regarding his Sir Joseph Porter, "Mr. Reed's impersonation, prim, dry, roundly articulated (and sung in tune, as some of his illustrious predecessors never attempted to do), was eminently likeable." Of his Sir Ruthven Murgatroyd, it said, "Reed, in particular, chose understatement as his main weapon, and in his dryness, at once naive and sophisticated, produced a Murgatroyd very much in the authentic D'Oyly Carte tradition. Critic Alan Blyth commented that in his Bunthorne, "Reed ... remains a past master of keeping the text fresh and articulated". Blyth also wrote that "The Lord Chancellor is one of John Reed's most appropriate roles, with plenty of scope for his fleet-footed clowning, and in the Nightmare-Song he gives an object-lesson in projecting one of Gilbert's most complex texts." In The New York Times, Milton Esterow praised Reed's Lord Chancellor: "Not only is he light, but he virtually floats. The man is irresistibly comic. Of course in his dignified official robes he is also austere, which is what a good Lord Chancellor should be."

Reed's fans eagerly anticipated his "business" in the many encores that followed some of his songs, in which "his antics would become ever more outrageous. ... Reed's Sir Joseph Porter would jump overboard only to re-enter clutching a rubber life-ring, while ... his Ko-Ko would be found furiously – and anachronistically – pedalling across the stage in a toy car." On the other hand, he was sometimes criticised for these instances of dropping character and adding anachronisms. He explained, "An encore is a different thing – a bit of fun between me and the audience – then I come right back into character again."

=== After the D'Oyly Carte ===
After he left the D'Oyly Carte organisation in 1979, Reed continued to perform in, and direct, Gilbert and Sullivan productions for the rest of his career, also occasionally appearing in other theatre. He appeared as a guest artist numerous times with D'Oyly Carte after his retirement, including their "last night" concert in 1982. The solo show A Song to Sing, O was created for and premiered by him at the Savoy Theatre in 1981. The reviewer for The Times disliked the piece, commenting, "The attraction is almost entirely the talented twisting of Mr. Reed's tongue around familiar patter."

Reed performed and directed, through the 1980s, with many Gilbert and Sullivan companies, both professional and amateur, flying back and forth from Europe to North America. These theatre companies included the London Savoyards (for whom he performed many of his familiar roles), Brussels Gilbert and Sullivan Society, the CU Opera Company in Boulder, Colorado (which awarded him an honorary doctorate) and the Colorado Music Theatre Festival there, and The Lyric Opera of Dallas. In 1983, he performed as Menelaus in Offenbach's La belle Hélène, and in a double bill of Trial by Jury (as the Learned Judge) and Offenbach's M. Choufleuri (as M. Balandard), with the Washington Opera at the Kennedy Center. He continued to direct in the U.S. into the early 1990s.

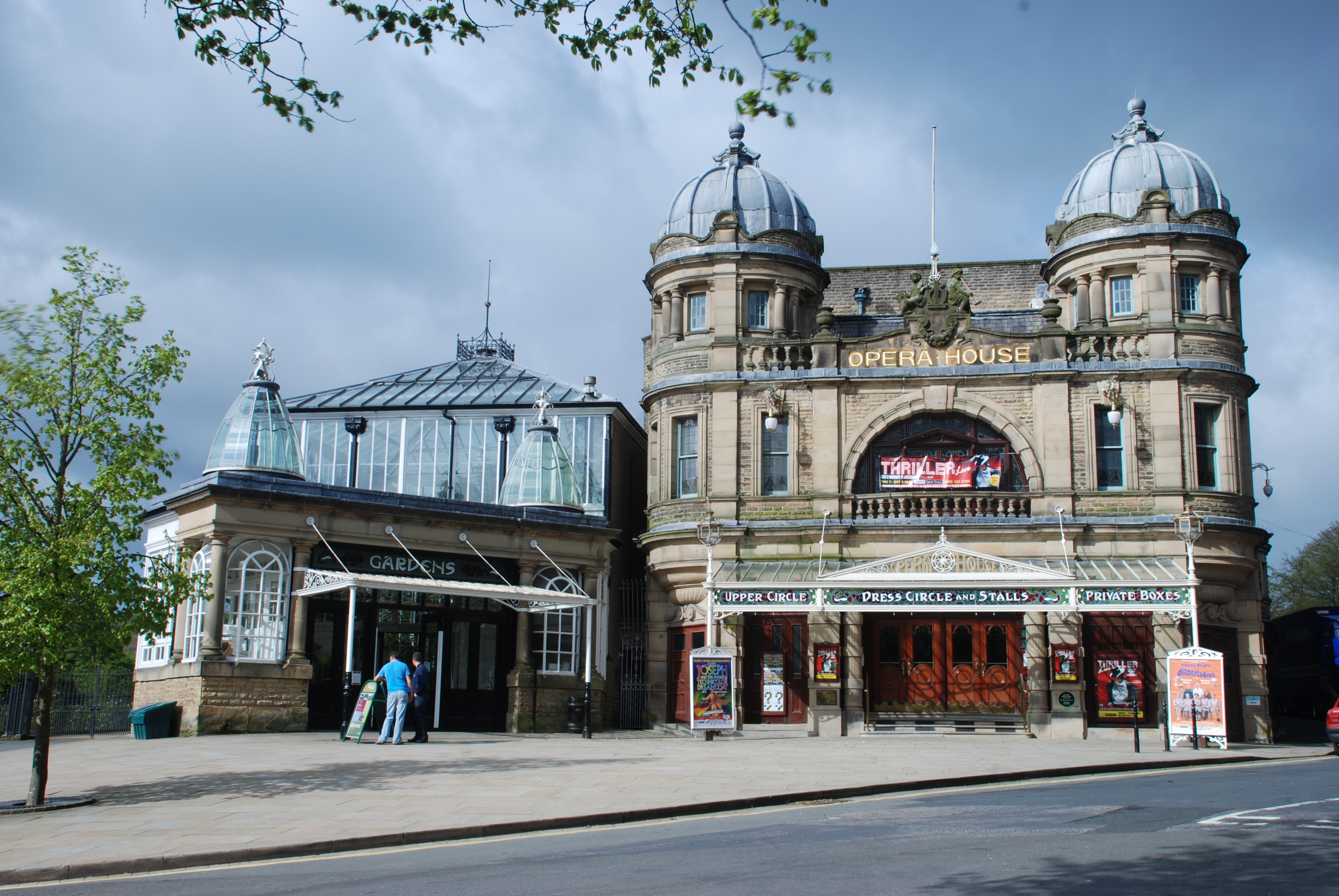
Buxton Opera House, where Reed appeared at the Gilbert and Sullivan Festival in later years.

He appeared, from 1984 until 1989, with the New York Gilbert and Sullivan Players (NYGASP), earning warm reviews for his "subtle facial gesture and small comic touch" and clear diction. Of his 1986 Bunthorne with the company, The New York Times wrote, "Mr. Reed does not overdo. He sings and speaks in a moderate tone of voice, never moves more than fairly quickly, and never hits the audience over the head with a joke. As a result, when he strikes a pose of even mild ridiculousness, the result is hilarity. He makes Bunthorne a good-natured poseur, and admits his dependency on adulation with endearing simplicity." At a NYGASP gala at Symphony Space in 1987, Reed proposed on stage to sex therapist and author Dr. Ruth Westheimer. He also performed in concerts in North America and Britain, including at The Berkshire Choral Institute as The Duke of Plaza Toro (with Kenneth Sandford as Don Alhambra) in The Gondoliers (1985). In reviewing a 1988 concert, The Boston Globe wrote that Reed "is near to perfect in his chosen field. Reed's acting, his command of patter and everything he does (which is a lot) to convince you that what he's emitting could really be mellifluous, all-out singing – all these are freshly and tirelessly amusing".

After retiring from the stage, Reed moved to Halifax, West Yorkshire, England, with his life partner (since 1958), John Nicholas Kerri, who also acted as his business manager. There he directed local amateur Gilbert and Sullivan societies, including the Harrogate Gilbert and Sullivan Society (1980–1994) and the West Yorkshire Savoyards, among others. Reed continued to direct, and to sing occasionally in concerts, until at least 2004, including at the International Gilbert and Sullivan Festival, where he also gave talks and participated in events, often with other former members of the D'Oyly Carte. Neil Smith, a director of that Festival, commented, "Reed had an unrivalled ability to imbue his performances with both madcap humour and deep pathos, a quality which, combined with the acrobatic agility of a trained dancer, brought him worldwide acclaim."

Reed had many hobbies, including oil painting, crafts and cooking, and he loved the ballet. He published his autobiography, Nothing Whatever to Grumble At: His Story, as told to Cynthia Morey, in 2006 Reed died on 13 February 2010 at the Calderdale Royal Hospital, Halifax, England, on his 94th birthday, after suffering a stroke. He had lost most of his eyesight through macular degeneration and had been diagnosed with dementia just before Christmas 2009. Reed had a companion of 52 years, Nicholas Kerri. Reed's remains were cremated, after a funeral service on 23 February 2010, at Park Wood Crematorium, Elland.

== Recordings ==
John Reed recorded all of his major roles with the D'Oyly Carte Opera Company for Decca Records between 1960 and 1979, some of them twice, and several of them complete with dialogue. In 1976, he participated in the only D'Oyly Carte recordings of Utopia, Limited and The Grand Duke, playing, respectively, Scaphio and Grand Duke Rudolph. These recordings are still available either on the Decca label or under licence from Decca on Sounds on CD, a private label specialising in Gilbert and Sullivan recordings. Reed also appeared in the 1966 film version of The Mikado and the 1973 video of H.M.S. Pinafore as Ko-Ko and Sir Joseph Porter, respectively. A 1965 BBC Television broadcast of Patience with Reed as Bunthorne is apparently lost. He was also the voice of Robin Oakapple in the 1967 Halas and Batchelor Ruddigore cartoon.

A collection of Reed's patter songs, entitled "Gilbert & Sullivan: Great Patter Songs", compiled to celebrate his 25-year anniversary with D'Oyly Carte, was re-released on CD in 2007. Sounds on CD also released Tête-à-Tête, a two-hour-long recording, from sessions from the 1970s, of Reed reminiscing with his friend and fellow D'Oyly Carte performer Peggy Ann Jones. In addition, the official live recording of the final performance of the original D'Oyly Carte Opera Company from February 1982, in which John Reed was a guest artist, is available from Sounds on CD.
