= John Brunton (scenic artist) =

Scottish scenic artist

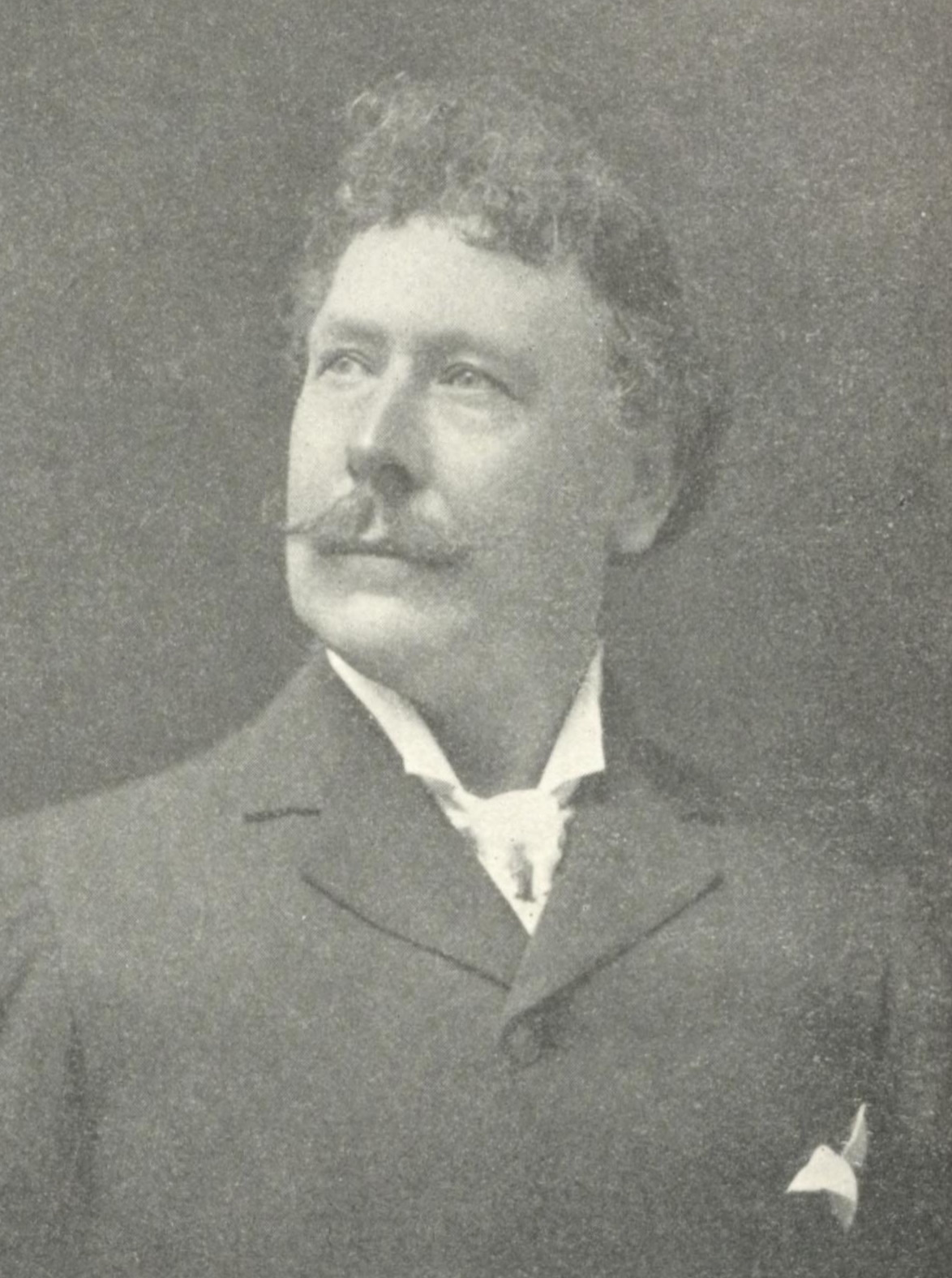
- Portrait of John Brunton, published in 1909.
- Born: John Brunton; 15 May 1849; Edinburgh, Scotland
- Died: 22 July 1909 (aged 60); Darlinghurst, New South Wales, Australia
- Occupations: theatre scenic artist; artist
- Spouse(s): (1) Sarah Hotchkis (2) Cecily Christina Neilsen

John Brunton (15 May 1849 – 22 July 1909) was a Scottish scenic artist who worked in theatres in Britain and Australia. Brunton was brought to Australia in 1886 by the theatrical partnership of Williamson, Garner and Musgrove. From about the mid-1890s he worked on productions by Bland Holt, known for his spectacular touring productions of melodramas and pantomimes. Brunton died in July 1909 in Sydney. He was the father of the popular actress, Dorothy Brunton.

== Biography ==
=== Early years ===
John Brunton was born on 15 May 1849 in Edinburgh, the son of John and Margaret Brunton. He was educated at the Royal High School in the Holyrood area of Edinburgh (north of The Canongate). As a boy Brunton "showed such a passionate inclination towards drawing and painting, that his father prudently allowed him to suit his own tastes in choosing a profession".

In about 1862 Brunton, aged thirteen years, was articled to William Glover as an apprentice scenic painter. Glover was a leading scenic artist, based in Glasgow. Brunton spent seven years with Glover in Glasgow, "learning every detail of his profession, and becoming a great favourite with Glover". As well as his artistic skills, William Glover "was an enthusiastic devotee" of both fencing and boxing and instilled a love of these sports onto his young protégé ("who proved no dullard"). As Brunton progressed at fencing "the two scene painters – master and pupil – to show their skill to an admiring world, gave the famous broadsword combat in Rob Roy in public during a revival of that play". This appearance was such a success that soon afterwards they played the Corsican Brothers at a benefit performance, "when the great duel scene was made their special effort". This proved so popular that Glover and Brunton "played the piece for a fortnight – more for devilment and pleasure than for profit". Glover had a custom whereby each year he took his apprentices "to some selected spot in the Western Highlands, where they encamped for a few weeks, living a delightfully Bohemian existence".

Brunton also studied painting under Sam Bough. Bough worked as a scene painter with William Glover in the mid-1860s at the Theatre Royal in Dunlop Street, Glasgow.

In 1867 Brunton, aged eighteen, probably had a relationship with an actress of about the same age named Georgina Duncan. In October 1867, in the Blythswood area of Glasgow, Duncan gave birth to a daughter, born out of wedlock. The child was named Carolina and raised by her mother with the surname Brunton. When Carolina Brunton married in March 1888, aged 21, she recorded her father's details as "John Brunton, Scenic Artist, Deceased".

=== Scenic artist ===
After his seven-year apprenticeship with Glover, Brunton was engaged as a scenic artist for twelve months at the Theatre Royal in Plymouth, county Devon. He painted scenery for a pantomime performed at Christmas 1869 and early in 1870.

During this period John Brunton married Sarah Hotchkis, a young woman he had met in Glasgow.^{[A]} The couple were married in April 1870 at Plymouth. John and Sarah Brunton had three children: Robert (born in about 1872 in Scotland), Frederick (born in 1878 in Liverpool) and Jessie (born in 1881 in Liverpool). The youngest child, Jessie, died as an infant in May 1882.

After a year in Plymouth, Brunton returned to Edinburgh during 1870 to work at the Theatre Royal in Broughton Street, managed by Charles Wyndham. The principal scenic artist at the Edinburgh Theatre Royal was William Gordon, father of George Gordon (a scenic artist who Brunton would later work with in Australia). Brunton remained at Edinburgh for about four years.

In about 1876 Brunton took up a position at the Royal Alexandra Theatre in Liverpool. He remained in Liverpool for nine years, a period Brunton later described "as the happiest time in his life". As well as painting scenery "for the usual dramatic pieces and the yearly pantomime (nine in all)", he also produced work for a number of Shakespearian productions. At his scene-painting studio in Liverpool, Brunton maintained a social space which his friends and acquaintances kept "well supplied with cigars and light refreshments of a spiritous kind". Part of the room was set up as "a shooting gallery". Another fixture of the room was a couple of trapezes, where the company engaged in "an amusement they termed the 'Battle of the Trapeze', another invention of the wily Brunton".

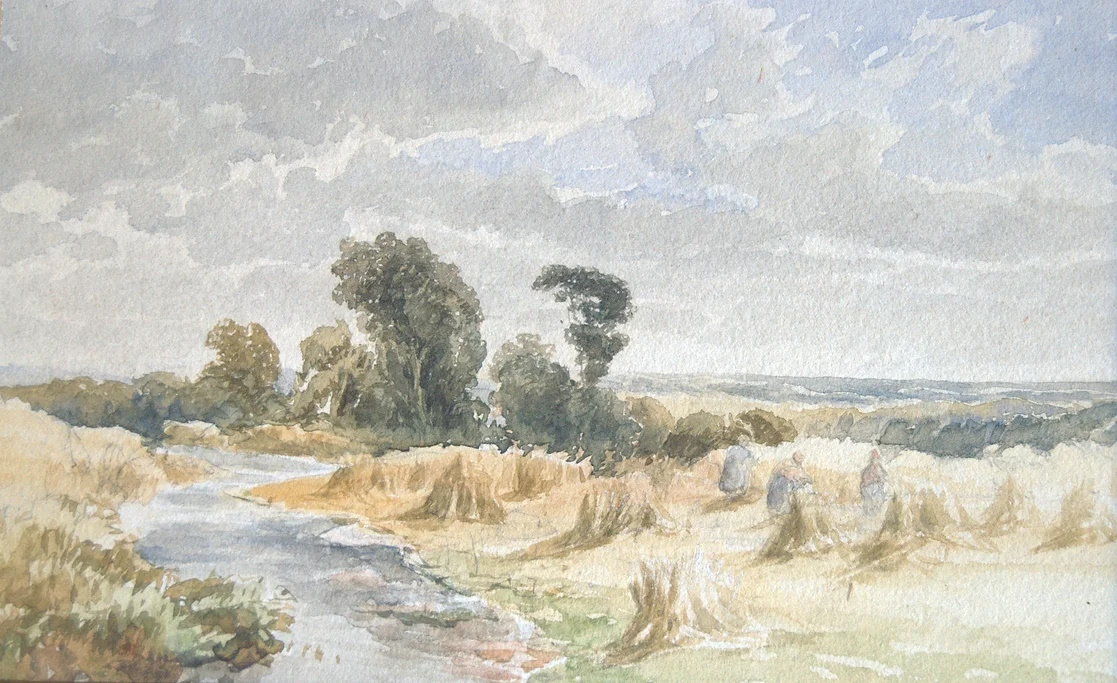
'Cornstooks' (c. 1880), watercolour painting by John Brunton.

At the time of the 1881 census John and Sarah Brunton and their children were living at 73 Crown Street in Liverpool.

During his period in Liverpool, Brunton probably maintained links with the Theatre Royal in Edinburgh. He produced the scenery for J. M. Campbell's drama Through My Heart First, performed at the Edinburgh Theatre Royal from about March 1884. A critic for the Edinburgh Courant newspaper commented on the scenery in the play (which was described as "most effective"): "So conscious were the audience of this that at the commencement of each act the artist was called for".

By 1885 or earlier Brunton had formed a relationship with Cecily Christina Neilsen (known as 'Cissy'), who had been a Shakespearean actress in Edinburgh. By the time Brunton and Cecily Neilsen departed for Australia in April 1886, Cecily was heavily-pregnant and gave birth a fortnight after the steamer left London. Brunton's wife Sarah and their two remaining children continued to live in Britain, so the implication is that Brunton deserted his wife and family. Sarah Brunton lived until January 1910 and there is no record of a divorce (nor is there a record of any marriage between Brunton and Cecily Neilsen). Upon arriving in Australia, Cecily was assumed to be "Mrs. John Brunton".

During his residency in Liverpool Brunton exhibited "a collection of his pictures" at Agnew's Art Gallery in London, for which he received favourable reviews. In 1886 one of his paintings was hung in the Royal Academy.

In 1886 the Australian theatrical production partnership of Williamson, Garner and Musgrove, based in Melbourne, engaged Brunton to travel to Australia to work for the partnership as a scenic artist. Australian newspaper reports anticipating Brunton's arrival described him as "an artist of distinction". In March 1886, prior to his departure for Australia, Brunton exhibited a collection of his paintings, comprising landscapes and seascapes, at the Liverpool Art Gallery. In a review of the exhibition a critic writing in the theatrical trade journal, The Era, described Brunton's work as possessing "a fanciful imagination and an ardent love of nature" supported by "solid technical acquirements gained in the best school".

A farewell gathering in Brunton's honour was held by the Liverpool Press Club on 1 April 1886, followed by another at the Grand Hotel.

=== To Australia ===
Brunton and the heavily-pregnant Cecily left London for Australia on 15 April 1886 aboard the R.M.S. Garonne, a mail steamer of the Orient Steam Navigation Company line. The steamer reached Port Said on April 29 where Cecily gave birth to a son (which the couple named John). "Mr. and Mrs. John Brunton" and their infant son arrived in Melbourne on 30 May 1886.

The initial engagement of Brunton by Messrs. Williamson, Garner and Musgrove was to take the place of George Gordon during Gordon's "temporary absence". In late-April 1886 the scenic artist, George Gordon returned to England for a five-month period, "partly for the sake of his health, which has suffered by his indefatigable industry and application; and partly to regain touch of the progress of pictorial art in Europe".

=== With Williamson, Garner and Musgrove ===
In early October 1886 the "nautical opera" Billee Taylor made its Australian premiere at the Theatre Royal in Sydney (which included in the cast the newly-arrived English comedian William Elton in the role of 'Ben Barnacle'). The operetta featured scenery by John Brunton as backdrop for each of its two acts: (Act I) a "village on Southampton water" ("the blue waters rippling on the sands, the mountains in the distance, and the cottage homes stretching away to the right") and (Act II) a view of Portsmouth harbour ("with stately ships at rest, the massive batteries in front").

On 27 December 1886 Williamson, Garner and Musgrove's production of Robinson Crusoe, written and arranged by Alfred Maltby, opened at the Theatre Royal in Melbourne. According to advertisements, the pantomime was "gorgeously illustrated with magnificent scenery" by Brunton, who had been employed "upon this work for upwards of six months". Advertisements for Robinson Crusoe during January 1887 attributed the scenery for the pantomime to both Brunton and John Hennings, a fellow scenic artist.

During 1887 Brunton was involved in the following theatrical productions:

- Harbour Lights in April 1887 at the New Princess Theatre in Melbourne (with George Gordon).
- Gilbert and Sullivan's musical satire Princess Ida, or Castle Adamant at the New Princess Theatre in Melbourne from August 1887; Brunton designed and painted the following scenery: Pavilions in King Hildebrand's Palace (Act I); Gardens of Castle Adamant (Act II); Courtyard of Castle Adamant (Act III).
- La Mascotte at the Theatre Royal in Sydney in November 1887.
- The pantomime Jack the Giant-killer, and Little Bo-Peep; or Harlequin King Arthur, and the Enchanted Sheep at Melbourne's Theatre Royal in late-December 1887 (with George Gordon and J. Peake).
- At Sydney's Theatre Royal Brunton and Hennings' scenes featured in the Robinson Crusoe pantomime from December 1887. A reviewer wrote of the production that "the various incidents and places are illustrated by pictures of great beauty".

In February 1888 the celebrated English actor Charles Warner arrived in Australia under engagement by Williamson, Garner and Musgrove. The scenic paintings undertaken by Brunton during 1888 included backdrops for the following productions featuring Warner in major roles:

- Drink, a play by Charles Reade (based on Émile Zola's novel, L'Assommoir) – performed at Melbourne's Theatre Royal from late-February 1888, Adelaide's Theatre Royal in June 1888 and at Sydney's Theatre Royal from late-July 1888 (with scenery by both Brunton and George Gordon).
- Holcroft's comedy, The Road to Ruin, starring the English actor Charles Warner; scenery by both George Gordon and John Brunton.
- Tom Taylor's play The Fool's Revenge at the Princess Theatre, Melbourne, in April 1888.
- Lord Lytton's The Lady of Lyons, performed at Melbourne's Princess Theatre in April and May 1888 and the Theatre Royal in Sydney in August 1888. Brunton's scene in the second act was described as "representing the garden of a French mansion laid out in the Italian style, with terraces, an ornamental sheet of water, formal parterres, and an avenue of trees opening out into a park beyond".

In May 1888 Brunton contributed a painting to the autumn exhibition of the Victorian Society of Artists. His painting, On the Fife Coast, Evening, was described as depicting "a rocky headland... against a rift in a stormy and twilight sky", painted "with a free and vigorous hand".

In March 1890 the theatrical partnership of Williamson, Garner and Musgrove was dissolved. Williamson and Garner retained management of the Princess Theatre and Theatre Royal in Melbourne and George Musgrove assumed management of the Theatre Royal in Sydney.

=== With Williamson and Garner ===
After the dissolution of the Williamson, Garner and Musgrove partnership, Brunton's services were initially retained by Williamson and Garner.

One of the feature productions brought to Australia in 1890 was Gilbert and Sullivan's The Gondoliers, first performed in Melbourne's Princess Theatre in late-October. Scenery for the production was supplemented by "specially printed" scenes and designs "forwarded from the Savoy Theatre, London". In preparing the scenery for The Gondoliers, Brunton was assisted by Phil Goatcher, a scenic artist who had returned to Australia from America under contract by Williamson.

The spectacular and popular pantomimes were an important showpiece for the theatrical scene painter. Williamson, Garner and Co.'s production of Aladdin was performed in Melbourne at the Theatre Royal during January and February 1891, starring the popular British actress Jennie Lee in the lead role. The scenery painted by John Brunton for the production was:

- Act 1: "Scene 1 – The Pyramids and the Sphinx. Scene 2 – The Market Place of Pekin. Scene 3 – On the Road to the Cave. Scene 4 – The Blasted Cedar. Scene 5 – The Cave of Jewels".
- Act 2: "Scene 1 – The Widder's 'Umble Cot. Scene 2 – Gardens of the Emperor's Palace".
- Act 3: "Scene 1 – Aladdin's Palace. The Willow Pattern Plate... Scene 2 – The Spot where the Palace Stood. Scene 3 – The Palace by the Beach".

A key scene in the pantomime Aladdin was the "Transformation Scene" which featured a "series of beautiful allegorical pictures" inspired by Wagner's Der Ring des Nibelungen, "poetically treated and painted" by Brunton and his staff of assistants.

Other Williamson, Garner & Co. productions during 1891, featuring Brunton's scenic designs, included Moths (adapted from a novel by Ouida) and Bridget O'Brien, Esq. (a "Musical-Farcical Comedy" written by Fred Lyster and John F. Sheridan).

=== Freelance work ===
By 1892 Brunton began to work for a number of theatrical entrepreneurs in addition to J. C. Williamson. Brunton painted new scenery for the George Rignold's production of the burlesque Randolph the Reckless at the Theatre Royal in Melbourne in March 1892. The following month his scenery featured in Rignold's "spectacular burlesque", Dick Whittington and His Cat, at Her Majesty's Theatre in Sydney. In May 1892 Brunton provided the scenery for Rignold's production of Little Jack Sheppard at the same theatre.

In late-May 1892 scenery by both Brunton and George Gordon was featured in George Musgrove's production of the musical burlesque, Faust Up to Date, at Melbourne's Opera House. Later in the year Brunton and Gordon's scenery was used for Musgrove's production of Carmen Up to Data at the Princess Theatre in Melbourne.

During the end-of-year pantomime season Brunton's scenery appeared in several different productions. His scenery for Aladdin (probably the paintings from Williamson and Garner's production a year earlier) were used in Adelaide for the pantomime produced by Wybert Reeve at the Theatre Royal, which premiered on Boxing Day 1892. The play also included new scenery by Charles Marques. In Melbourne new scenery by Brunton was featured in the pantomime for the 1892-3 holiday season, Babes in the Wood, Bold Robin Hood and his Foresters Good, presented at the Theatre Royal by George Coppin in collaboration with Bland Holt. Extravagant claims for made for Brunton's work for the production: "The talented scenic artist, Mr. John Brunton, has completely thrown all his previous works into the shade by the poetical imagination, artistic designs, and magnificent effects he has displayed upon the present occasion". Scenes from the play included "a view of Sherwood Forest, an old English village in its neighbourhood, and Windsor Castle".

Brunton prepared "glorious scenery" for a new drama by George Darrell and his company, The Double Event (subtitled A Tale of the Melbourne Cup), which premiered at Melbourne's Theatre Royal in April 1893. The play featured a spectacular scene in which twenty thoroughbred horses and their jockeys appeared. The Double Event was staged in Sydney in late-July 1893 at Her Majesty's Theatre, this time under the management of George Rignold. One of Brunton's scenes, depicting training stables with a house and garden in the foreground, "was received with an enthusiasm which was not appeased until the painter, Mr. John Brunton, had bowed his acknowledgements". The reviewer attributed the success of the painting to "the beauty of a distant view, framed by the foliage of the trees into a charming medallion of sapphire sea surrounding a green islet, above which rose a stately mansion". Another scene, in the last act of The Double Event, depicted the gardens of Mayfield House at Potts Point, beyond which was disclosed "a distant view of the harbour by night, with the lights of Fort Macquarie and the oceangoing steamers gleaming above the water, and the dark shores beyond bluely outlined beneath the moon-lit sky". For this painting also, "well-merited applause was forthcoming". Brunton's work on The Double Event was assisted by Alfred Clint.

In September 1894 Brunton was elected as a new member of the Art Society of New South Wales.

=== With Bland Holt ===
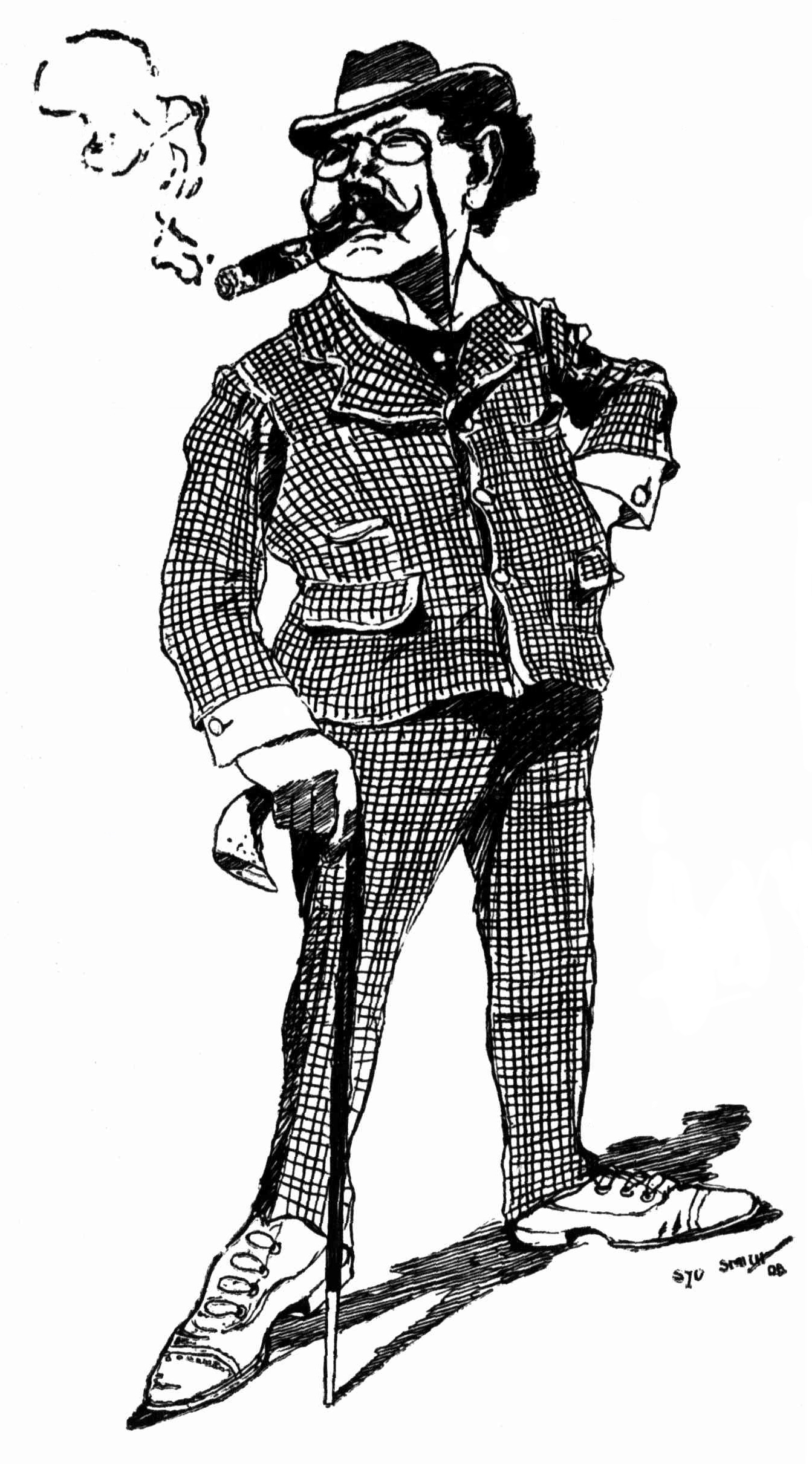
Caricature of John Brunton (published in The Gadfly, 3 June 1908).

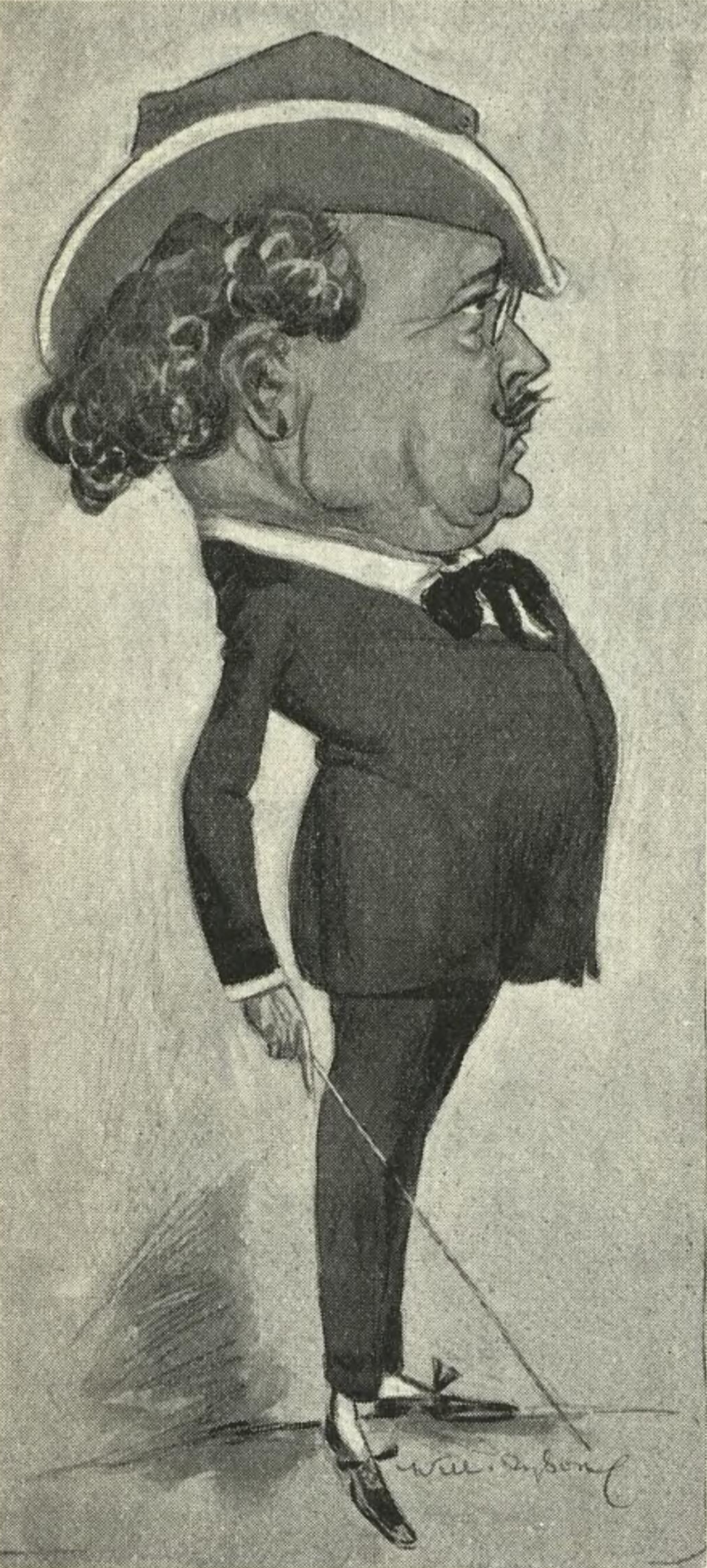
Caricature of John Brunton by Will Dyson (The Bulletin, 5 August 1909).

From the mid- to late-1890s John Brunton increasingly worked for Bland Holt, the theatrical manager known for his spectacular touring productions of melodramas and pantomimes. In September 1896 it was reported that Brunton had been engaged by Holt at the Theatre Royal in Sydney, to replace W. B. Spong who was expected to depart for England early in 1897. Alfred Clint was to replace Brunton during George Rignold's season at the Theatre Royal in Melbourne. In the latter months of 1896 Brunton worked with Spong on the Bland Holt's productions, For England and In Sight of St. Paul's.

During 1897 Brunton's scenic paintings featured in Holt's touring productions such as The Cotton King, The Union Jack and The Prodigal Daughter. Bland Holt productions in 1898 which incorporated Brunton's scenic designs included A Life of Pleasure, Straight From the Heart and Sporting Life. Holt's production of Woman and Wine at Melbourne's Theatre Royal in April 1899 featured "Wonder-Compelling Tableaux" by John Brunton, the scenes consisting of "a French Racecourse", "The Boulevard Cafe", "The Japanese Ball", "The Paris Flower Market", "The Blind Man's Vision" and "The Trial at Le Palais de Justice".

In December 1902 the Bland Holt Company presented The Breaking of the Drought at the Lyceum Theatre in Sydney, written by the English playwright Arthur Shirley. The reviewer for the Sydney Morning Herald described Brunton's scenic effects as "admirable". From the second act the play featured scenes of Sydney and "the audience cheered loudly as the curtain rose on each new place". The Daily Telegraph reviewer was critical of Brunton's depiction of an "out-back station homestead" in Act 1, which more closely resembled "a suburban cottage". However, the reviewer was more complimentary of some of Brunton's other scenes in the play: "the interior of Gilbert Galloway's 'flat' in Sydney", "the baths at Little Coogee, which are animated by a crowd of bathers of both sexes" and "the coffee-stall scene at Paddy's Market".

In April 1908 Brunton's daughter Dorothy made her stage debut, aged seventeen years, as a flower girl in Bland Holt's production of The White Heather at the Theatre Royal in Adelaide. Following her debut in The White Heather, Brunton was cast in a series of productions presented by Bland Holt's Dramatic Company at the Theatre Royal in Adelaide.

After their eight week season in Adelaide the Bland Holt Company played a short season in Broken Hill in June 1908. Brunton took the opportunity to visit the Broken Hill Proprietary Company's silver and lead mine and other mines "along the line of lode". A local newspaper report of his visit remarked that he was "keenly alive to the artistic value of the huge weather-stained and dust-begrimed piles of surface buildings which lend a picturesque aspect to the line of mines". Brunton "made copious notes for reference when working up mining scenery for future dramas". From Broken Hill the company travelled to Perth in Western Australia, where, on 11 July 1908, they staged The Breaking of the Drought in His Majesty's Theatre.

In April 1909 the Bland Holt Company began a season in Brisbane, opening with The Great Millionaire at His Majesty's Theatre, which featured "beautiful examples of the scene painter's art by Mr. John Brunton".

In late-May 1909 it was reported that Brunton "had been hard at work on the Australian landscapes which are to be used in 'The Great Rescue'". By June 1909 the Bland Holt Dramatic Company had returned to Sydney. The Great Rescue opened at the Theatre Royal in early June 1909, with scenery by Brunton illustrating "Northern Queensland and the Wombat mine".

=== Death ===
John Brunton died "from heart failure" (described as an "unexpected decease") on 22 July 1909 at his home, 'Roslyn Gardens', in Darlinghurst. He was buried at the Waverley Cemetery. At the time of his death Brunton was working on the scenes for The Sins of Society, an upcoming production by Bland Holt.

On 12 August 1909 Dorothy Brunton participated in a grand theatrical event commemorating her late father. 'The Brunton Memorial Matinee', Bland Holt's production at the Theatre Royal in aid of the John Brunton Memorial Fund, was an event involving "over two hundred" performers from a number of theatrical companies. In September 1909 Dorothy was performing the role of the gypsy fortune teller in Sydney performances of The Flood Tide, with the production using the scenery created by her late father.

In late August 1909 over one hundred paintings by the late John Brunton were exhibited in the rooms of The Pianola Company in George Street, Sydney. An admission of one shilling was charged for the week-long exhibition, for the benefit of the John Brunton Memorial Fund.

Sarah Brunton (recorded in the Scottish Probate Index as "Sarah Hotchkiss or Brunton") died on 9 January 1910 at Glasgow. She had been living at 331 Gairbraid Street in the Maryhill area, north of the city centre. The widow's estate was valued at £16.2s.1d.

In May 1910 it was reported that "a number of oil-paintings and water-colour drawings" by the late John Brunton had been hung in the foyer of Her Majesty's Theatre in Melbourne. The works were available for sale, with the proceeds "for the benefit of his widow" (Cecily Brunton).

== Family structure and interactions ==
John Brunton had a complicated family structure. He is known to have fathered seven children by three different women:

- As a young man Brunton's relationship with a young actress, Georgina Duncan, resulted in a daughter, born out of wedlock in October 1867. The daughter, named Caroline, was raised with the surname Brunton.
- Brunton married Sarah Hotchkis in April 1870 at Plymouth and the couple had three children: Robert Argyle (born in about 1872 in Scotland), Frederick James (born in 1878 in Liverpool) and Jessie (born in 1881 in Liverpool; died as an infant in May 1882). Robert and Frederick were raised by their mother after about 1885 when Brunton began a relationship with the actress Cecily Neilsen and the couple relocated to Australia. Like his father, the eldest son Robert Brunton worked as a theatrical scenic artist. He travelled to America and became involved in the nascent film-making industry in Los Angeles, eventually owning and managing Robert Brunton Studios, a successful venture for the leasing of facilities to motion picture companies that did not possess their own studios. Brunton's wife Sarah died in January 1910 in Glasgow (less than six months after Brunton's death in Sydney).
- Brunton formed a relationship with the actress Cecily Christina ('Cissy') Neilsen by about 1885 and the couple lived as husband and wife after their immigration to Australia in 1886. There were three children from the union: John ('Jack'), born at Port Said in late-April 1886 aboard the R.M.S. Garonne, James (born in 1888 in Carlton, Victoria) and Christine Dorothy Brunton (born in October 1890 in Carlton). As a young man Jack Brunton travelled extensively, spending periods of time in England, West Africa, Mexico and the United States. In America he found a job travelling with motion pictures along the Pacific Coast and to Alaska. After his return to Australia he owned and operated two picture theatres in Melbourne. In 1916 Jack Brunton enlisted in the A.I.F. The youngest child, popularly known as Dorothy or Dot Brunton, had a successful career in Australia and England as a singer and actress in musical comedy roles. 'Cissy' Brunton was a constant companion and mentor to her daughter, particularly during the early part of her career. Cecily ('Cissy') Brunton died on 22 June 1933 in Sydney.

After their father died in 1909 there was interaction between certain of the Brunton half-siblings, based to a large extent on common interests in the film industry. By the early 1920s Jack Brunton was working for his half-brother Robert Brunton as "the producing manager" for his film studios business. In November 1921 Dorothy Brunton and her mother travelled to California and met up with Dorothy's half-brother Robert at his studio complex in Los Angeles (as well as Dorothy's brother Jack). At the time Robert was in the process of selling the Brunton Studios.^{[B]} In February 1922 Dorothy and Robert Brunton travelled to Italy, while Cissy Brunton returned to Sydney. The Brunton half-siblings toured Europe, visiting Italy, France, Switzerland, Germany "and other countries in a leisurely way". After arriving in London they "followed this by motoring in their own car all over England and Scotland". Robert Brunton died in March 1923 in London of a cerebral haemorrhage (after two weeks' illness), aged 51 years.

== Notes ==
A.Sarah Paterson Hotchkis was born on 5 January 1853 at Glasgow in Scotland, the daughter of John Hotchkis (or Hotchkies) and Sarah (née Paterson). Her father's occupation was recorded as an "iron turner".

B.Robert Brunton Studios was purchased by a New York-based syndicate headed by Joseph Schenck, a leading independent producer of motion pictures. The Schenck syndicate renamed the studio complex United Studios, which was placed under the management of Michael C. Levee (who had previously been Brunton's vice-president and treasurer). In 1926 Paramount Pictures purchased the United Studios complex and extensively rebuilt the facilities to form Paramount Studios.
