= Phil Goatcher =

English-born theatre scene painter (1851–1931)

Phillip William Goatcher (23 November 1851 (Note: A report of his 80th birthday in 1930 may be disregarded, as evidenced by a later news item.) – 8 October 1931), often spelled "Philip", signing his work "Phil. W. Goatcher", was an English-born theatre scene painter who had a considerable career in America and Australia. His American-born son James Goatcher followed in his father's footsteps in Sydney, then both left for Perth, Western Australia, where they set up in business as painters and decorators. In later life James Goatcher was a highly regarded watercolor artist.

== Phil W. Goatcher ==
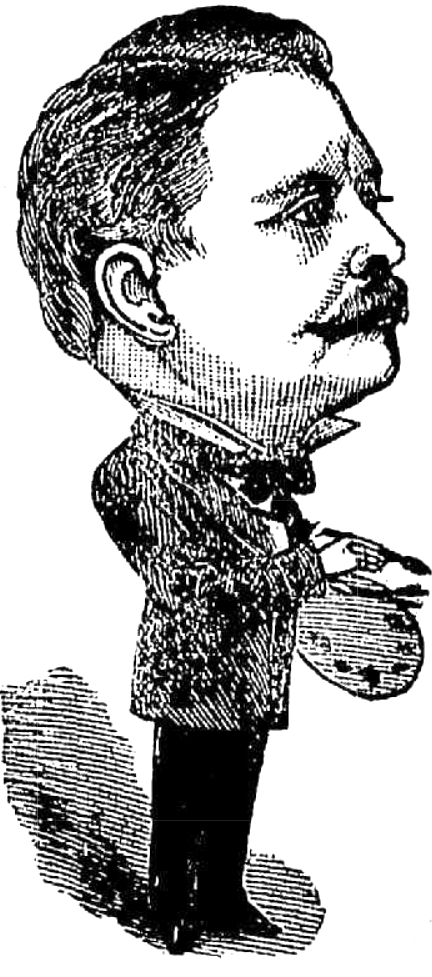
Phil W. Goatcher, scenic artist

Goatcher was born in London, a son of Phil Goatcher (died 22 December 1897), who may have been a scenic painter. After leaving school, he signed on as an apprentice on the sailing ship True Briton.

=== Australia ===
True Briton docked at Melbourne in 1866, and he had a brief reunion with his aunt and uncle Boxall in Ballarat, and despite their entreaties returned to the ship. He again made port in Melbourne a year later, aboard Dover Castle (Note: True Briton arrived at Port Phillip in July 1866 and Dover Castle in March 1867. A newspaper obituary put his first arrival in 1864 and another historian only mentions his 1867 arrival, ship not specified.) and this time decamped and returned to Ballarat where he found employment as an assistant to the scene painter John Hennings, who took a shine to the boy and gave him some lessons, both there and with H. M. Freyberger at the Theatre Royal, Melbourne, of which Hennings was a co-lessee. Around 1868 he took off with one John L. Hall for the Thames goldfields in New Zealand, but after failing to "strike it rich", took a job with Charles Massey, (Note: Massey died 1881 in Adelaide, and was buried at the West Terrace Cemetery.) painting scenes for the Robert Heir company at the Theatre Royal, Grahamstown (now Onerahi). (Note: The Heir troupe was in Grahamstown in July 1869, but not Robert Heir, who died in March 1868 on his way to New Zealand and was buried near Auckland.) He stayed with that company until they were back in Sydney, then joined an American ship as an ordinary seaman.

=== America ===
Goatcher left the ship at San Francisco, where he soon found work, then in 1870 was taken on at John McCullough's California Theatre, painting scenery with William Porter for several of Wilson Barrett's productions. It was while working at the California that he first encountered David Belasco, J. C. Williamson and Maggie Moore. A year later he was on the road again, touring Central America and the West Indies, where he notably painted a drop-curtain for the Kingston Theatre (Note: As per source, but by this time it had been replaced by the Theatre Royal, Kingston.) in Jamaica. In 1871 he was in New York, painting under Matt Morgan, one of America's great scenic artists. He moved on to the old St James' Theatre, Boston, where W. H. Leake had the lease. From 1873 to 1875 he was in England, for much of that time in partnership with W. B. Spong, then abruptly and without saying goodbye, left for America. For three years he was in Philadelphia, under contract to the Kiralfy brothers, decorating their newly-acquired Alhambra Palace Theatre, and scenery for William E. Sheridan at the Chestnut Street Theatre and in New York working at Abbey's Park Theatre. That was followed by ten years at Wallack's Theatre in New York, when he did some of his best and most important work, Antony and Cleopatra for the Potter-Bellew Company, and other productions for Edwin Booth, Wilson Barrett and Lillie Langtry. He was naturalized as a US citizen in 1882. During this period he met William Elton, who would go on to an eminent career in Australia. In 1886 he was a scenic artist for Jeannette Thurber's American Opera Company. He claimed to have painted the scenes for the first American production of H.M.S. Pinafore. During the summer breaks, Goatcher produced under contract numerous drop-scenes painted to give the impression of a lustrous fabric, such as satin, so effective that the deception was not seen until close up; they were used in various theatres across America. In 1888 he joined with John H. Young in Manhattan as Goatcher & Young, scenic designers, but despite lucrative contracts such as a Macbeth production starring Lillie Langtry, and a huge cyclorama depicting the Shenandoah Valley, the shop was a commercial failure. He left with his sons James and Philip jnr for London, where he was engaged by the Adelphi Theatre, then in July 1890 was given a three-year contract by J. C. Williamson to work for him in Australia.

=== Australia again ===
His first commission on returning to Australia was as assistant to John Brunton on The Gondoliers at the Princess Theatre, Melbourne for Williamson and Arthur Garner in October 1890, followed by Buchanan and Sims' The English Rose at the Theatre Royal. Other triumphs in this period were the pantomimes The Merry Monarch in 1891, Beauty and the Beast with George Gordon in 1893, also Around the World in Sixty Days [yes] and Cinderella and the Little Glass Slipper at the Lyceum Theatre, Sydney in 1894. Topping them all was Djin Djin, the Japanese Bogie-man, with scenery from Goatcher, George and Jack Gordon, and W. B. Spong for Christmas 1895.

In 1895 he was commissioned to decorate the interior of George Adams's new Palace Theatre, Sydney, and took on the dual responsibilities of lessee and director. His plans fell through, however, and he was forced to declare insolvency, and returned to the paintpot and brush. In 1898 he won a commission to decorate the Singer Sewing Machine showroom in Sydney’s Queen Victoria Building, using Wunderlich zinc ceiling tiles to create an Oriental atmosphere. Five years later he would decorate the Singer company's Melbourne showrooms in the Block Arcade, and in 1907 decorated the smoking room of the Menzies Hotel, Melbourne, with motifs of progress and modernization. In 1902 he was engaged to supervise decoration of the new Her Majesty's Theatre, Auckland, New Zealand.

=== Western Australia ===
Around 1903 Goatcher, with his wife Emma and younger son James, left for Western Australia in the hope that Perth's drier climate would be beneficial to his health, as he had been suffering from a chronic respiratory complaint, and in 1904 set up in business as "Phil W. Goatcher & Son, Art Decorators and General House Painters". He did, however, take on several scene painting commissions in the eastern states, notably The Chocolate Soldier, which opened in Melbourne in August 1911 before transferring to Sydney in November, in time for his 60th birthday.

He made an oil painting of The Assumption at the Church of St John the Evangelist, Fremantle, and another in 1922, entitled "Come unto me all ye who labour" mural at the Heritage-listed All Saints' Anglican Church, Collie, a variation on the Adoration of the Magi depicting the Virgin and Child being reverenced by the local Aboriginals, church dignitaries and miners.

==== Boulder Town Hall "curtain" ====
Goatcher was noted for his trompe-l'œil act-drops in various designs which gave the illusion of (for instance) exotic scenery behind rich and elaborate curtains. The purpose of an act-drop is to hide on-stage activity by scene shifters between acts, and for the more expensive productions would be new designs, freshly painted and possibly a different screen for each act. Being highly visible at times during times of no other activity, they were the subject of scrutiny and contributed significantly to the success of the play. Unlike other works of art, the paintwork on act-drops was considered disposable, and at the end of a show's season the canvas, if still serviceable, would be washed down (the paint used being water-soluble) and reused for the next production. A rare survival of this process is an 8.45 by 6.25 metres (27.7 ft × 20.5 ft) act-drop painted by Goatcher in 1908, held at the Town Hall in the town of Boulder, Western Australia. It was discovered in 1990 amongst a lot of discarded material by a local artist. Restoration began six years later and cost $250,000.

Guided tours are held several times a week, and visitors may see the work lowered and raised by its original machinery (it has a timber frame). The carefully preserved hall is itself of further historic interest as the site of performances by Nellie Melba, Eileen Joyce and Joan Sutherland.

A photograph of the "curtain" may be viewed here.

The Goatcher Auditorium at Wesley College in South Perth was named in his honour in 2008.

== James Goatcher ==
James Goatcher (14 August 1879 – 29 July 1957) was born in Philadelphia, USA, to Phillip Goatcher and his wife Alice née Little (1857–1934). His parents separated around 1890 and James was one who elected to leave for Australia with his father. He studied painting under his father, also took classes in Sydney and the Melbourne Art Gallery, and in his student days he may have shared accommodation with the Lindsay brothers. He was apprenticed as scene painter for J. C. Williamson's, and was accepted as a member of the Royal Art Society of New South Wales.

His father remarried and in December 1903 the family relocated to Perth, Western Australia, setting up in business as Goatcher & Son, decorators. He served a term as president of the Master Painters Society. He was a longtime member of the West Australian Society of Arts, and served a term as vice-president in 1952 but, being a tradesman, was not invited to join the Perth Society of Artists. In later years he was a prolific painter of watercolor paintings for which he held annual exhibitions at the Newspaper House gallery. They found a ready market by virtue of his conservative choice of subject, pleasing colors and skilful brushwork, though dismissed by critics for the same reasons. His watercolor Clouds over the Valley won a Claude Hotchin Art Prize in 1950. Hotchin was himself a great patron of West Australian artists, and purchased many of Goatcher's works, many finding their way to public institutions and regional art galleries.

== Family ==
Philip Goatcher (1826 – 22 December 1897), sanitary inspector, married Mary Ann Betts (1825–1898) in 1846.

- Elizabeth Catherine Goatcher (c. 1847 – 4 November 1930) married Ward
- Mary Goatcher (24 June 1850 – ) married Hockey
- Phillip William Goatcher (23 November 1851 – 8 October 1931) married Alice Little (1857–1934) in London in 1875. He left her in 1890, having failed to secure a divorce.

- Louisa Goatcher (1877– ) remained with her mother when father left in 1890.
- Phillip Walter Goatcher (c. 1877 – 27 October 1913), a.k.a. Phillip W. Goatcher jun., left the US with his father, married Minnie. He trained in London with the scenic artist William Telbin jnr (1846–1931), returning to Melbourne in 1910. He died at Waterfall Sanatorium, a tuberculosis hospital near Sydney.
- James Goatcher (14 August 1879 – 29 July 1957) left the US with his father, married Margaret Mary "Dolly" Healy ( – 14 April 1946), lived Mount Lawley, Western Australia

- Merle Goatcher (maybe 9 September 1918 – ) married Dr K. R. Miles, lived in Adelaide.
- Phil Goatcher married Jennie, lived in Adelaide.

- Arthur Goatcher (1885– ) born in New York, remained with his mother when father left in 1890.
He married again on 15 July 1899, to Emma Stone (c. 1873 – 24 December 1913) and had twin sons, of whom one survived. They had a home at 20 Gordon Street, West Perth.
- Ernest Goatcher (c. April 1900 – 8 January 1901)
- Robert Goatcher (c. April 1900 – 1985)

- Robert Goatcher (24 October 1853 – )
- James Goatcher (16 November 1857 – 8 March 1924) died in London
- Jane Goatcher (14 March 1861 – ) married Pearse
