= George Gordon (scenic artist) =

British and Australian scenic designer and artist

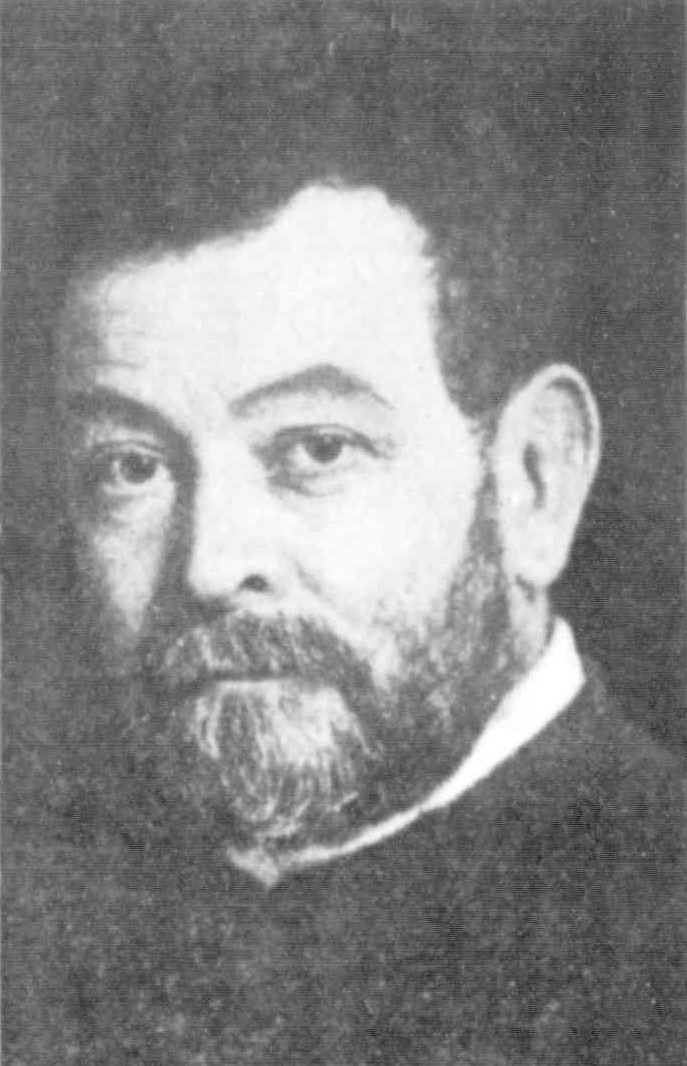
- Portrait of George Gordon, published in June 1899.
- Born: George Cameron Gordon; 11 June 1839; Edinburgh, Scotland
- Died: 12 June 1899 (aged 60); Melbourne, Victoria, Australia
- Occupation(s): theatre scenic artist; artist
- Spouse: Marion Jones
- Parent: William Gordon & Jane (née Stephens)

George Cameron Gordon (11 June 1839 – 12 June 1899) was a British scenic designer and artist in Australia.

His father was in the same line of business and his son John "Jack" Gordon (c. 1874 – 24 November 1911) following the family tradition, was head the scenic department of J. C. Williamson's theatrical management company for ten years.

== Early years in Scotland ==
George Cameron Gordon was born on 11 June 1839 in Edinburgh, Scotland, the son of William Gordon and Jane (née Stephens). He learned the craft of scene painting from his father at the Theatre Royal in Edinburgh.

He was working professionally as a scenic artist by age fourteen. Gordon's first pieces were for the Prince of Wales Theatre in London, where he made the acquaintance of the actor George Rignold, through the mutual friendship of their fathers.

In 1857, aged eighteen, Gordon "had control of the painting loft at a prominent Bristol theatre". By about 1860 he was working in London for the major theatrical entrepreneurs, most notably at the Gaiety and Prince of Wales theatres.

Gordon is credited, while working for the Bancrofts in about 1870, with introducing ceilings into stage settings.

Acting on George Rignold's advice, Gordon accepted an offer of employment in Australia from Arthur Garner.

== Stage design in Australia ==
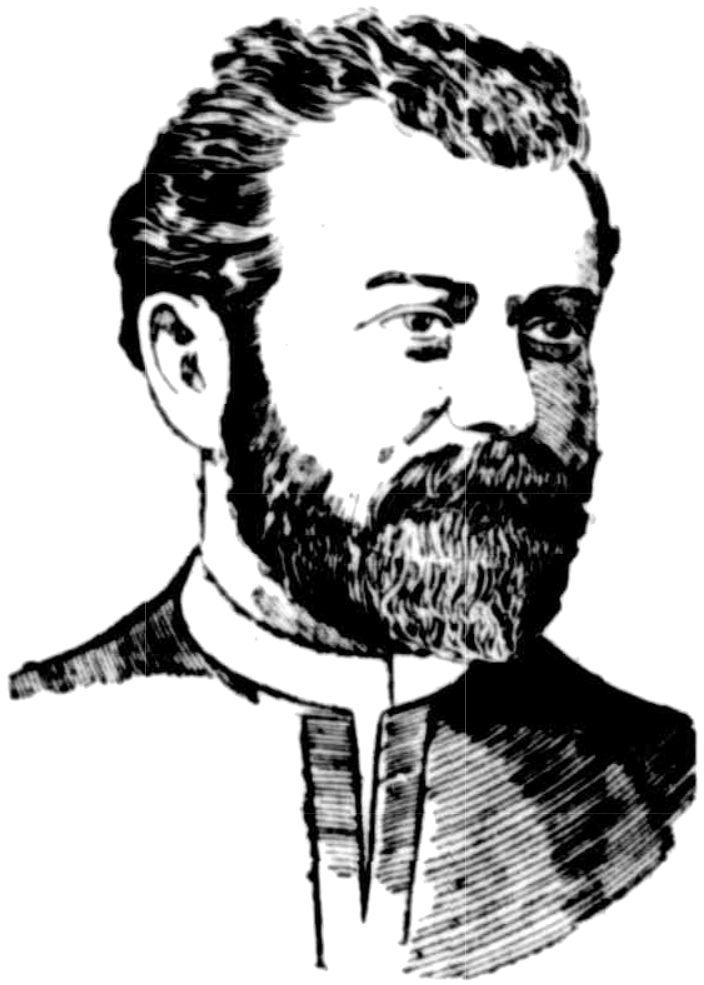
George Gordon

Gordon came to Australia with Garner's London Comedy Company on the steamer Aconcagua in June 1879. The company opened with a French comedy Friends at the Princess's Theatre, Melbourne, followed in November at the Theatre Royal, Adelaide, and the Theatre Royal, Sydney in March 1880. The tour terminated in Adelaide in May 1881, and Gordon, whose work had been eulogised in practically every review of the company's performances, remained in Australia under contract to J. C. Williamson, who had spent a fortune on the latest works from Gilbert and Sullivan.

Gordon worked for the theatrical partnership of Williamson, Garner and Musgrove from 1882 to 1890, but not exclusively — he also took on projects for W. S. Lyster, Samuel Lazar, John F. Sheridan, George Rignold and Robert Brough.

Gordon worked in tandem with John Hennings on the sets of The Lights o' London in Sydney in 1882, and Phil Goatcher shared credits with Gordon for Williamson's 1892 production of The Silver King.

Another notable production was the brilliant 1895 Christmas pantomime Djin Djin, the Japanese Bogie-man, which departed from the usual fairytale in both theme and production, with scenery from Gordon and his son Jack, Goatcher, and Spong, not to mention the performers, which included the riotously funny Billy Elton, music and libretto, in which the witty Dr Neild had a hand. Critics applauded Williamson for investing so heavily in an unproven venture.

== Theatre decoration ==
In 1880 Garner took over the lease of White's Rooms on King William Street, Adelaide, and gave it a total makeover, giving Gordon the responsibility for internal decoration. It was refitted as theatre known as Garner's Theatre, and after several changes of management and names, became the Majestic Theatre in 1916.

In 1886 he designed and decorated the interior of Melbourne's new Princess Theatre, built for "The Triumvirate" of Williamson, Musgrove and Garner.

== Other interests ==
Gordon was an accomplished painter in watercolours; at least one critic thought such pieces constituted his best work.

He has been mentioned as a tutor to Tom Roberts.

== Death and legacy ==
Late on the evening of 20 May 1899 Gordon took the tram from the Princess Theatre in Melbourne, down Nicholson Street to his residence at Grantown House. He alighted, but then tripped and fell heavily and had to be assisted home. (Note: Though Gordon was well clear of the (stationary) vehicle, some newspapers called it a "tram accident".) His doctor, J. E. Neild, was called for, but he saw no reason to be concerned, and as George had clearly fallen asleep, promised Mrs Gordon he would return the next day to check on his condition. That day came, and Neild saw no cause for concern, but a few days later the condition was clearly deteriorating, with an abnormally fast pulse and elevated temperature. A Collins Street specialist was called, and the patient removed to a small private hospital. Sir Thomas Williams was called for, but he could add nothing to the diagnosis of concussion and possible skull fracture. Gordon gave hopes for a recovery on the 10th, but died on the evening of 12 June. At the inquest Neild revealed that Gordon had on at least one occasion collapsed unconscious in what may have been an epileptic seizure.

Gordon was described by one critic as "unquestionably the greatest scene painter that ever came to Australia".

== John Gordon ==
George's son, "Jack" Gordon was born in London, and came to Australia at age seven with his parents. He studied painting at the Melbourne Gallery Art School, and for many years worked with his father. On the death of his father, he was promoted to head Williamson's scenic department. One of his most admired pieces was a backdrop of the Bay of Nagasaka [sic] for the first act of Madame Butterfly, starring Nellie Melba.

He was married, and had a home at 71 Lower Fort Street, Millers Point, New South Wales. He died aged 37. He died at home after a brief illness. His remains were interred at the Waverley Cemetery.
