= William Glover (artist) =

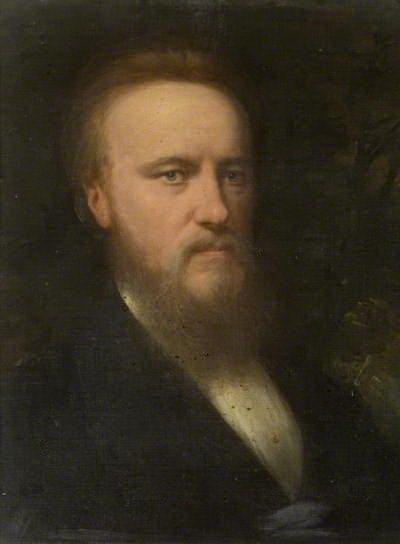
- Portrait of William Glover by Andrew Carrick Gow.
- Born: William Glover; 4 November 1836; Croydon, England.
- Died: 23 August 1916 (aged 79); Glasgow, Scotland.
- Occupation(s): artist, scenic artist, theatre manager
- Spouse(s): (1) Emily Josephine Kohler (2) Agnes Brown
- Parent(s): Edmund Glover & Elizabeth (née Nelson)

Signature
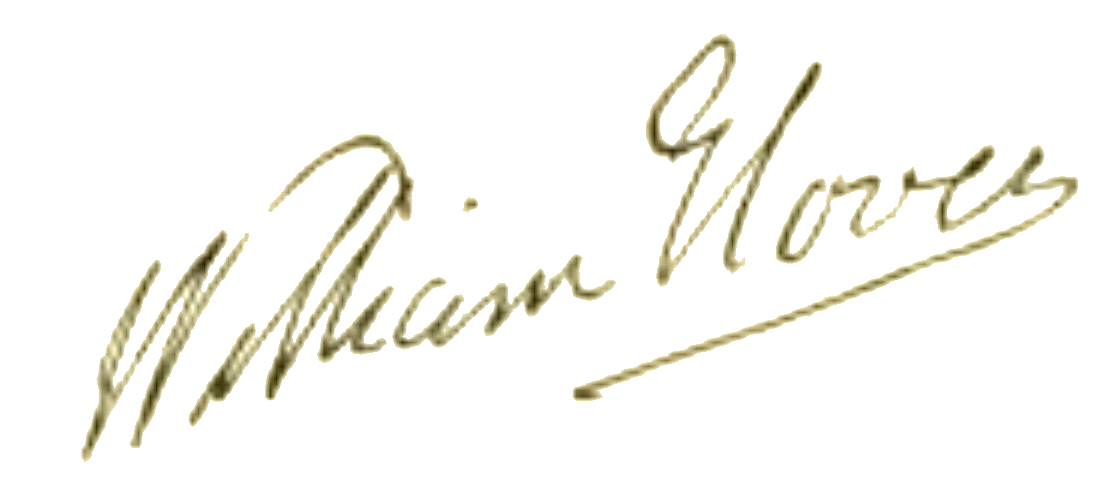

William Glover (4 November 1836 – 23 August 1916) was an artist, theatre scenic painter and theatre manager. For most of his professional life Glover was associated with theatrical enterprise in Scotland, particularly in Glasgow.

== Biography ==
=== Early years ===
William Glover was born on 4 November 1836 at Croydon in South London, the son of the actor, theatre manager and artist, Edmund Glover, and his wife Elizabeth (née Nelson). He was born into a theatrical family. Glover's paternal grandmother was "the celebrated" Julia Glover, "one of the leading comediennes in the early decades of the 19th century".

As a young man in London, Glover "enjoyed the friendship of Charles Dickens".

=== A scenic painter ===
Glover pursued a passion for painting and developed his talent as a scenic painter for theatres. He became recognised as one of the foremost scenic artists in the United Kingdom.

William Glover and Emily Josephine Kohler were married on 18 May 1860 in Dublin, Ireland. The couple had fourteen children born between 1861 and 1881, four of whom died in infancy or early childhood.

=== Business ventures ===
William Glover's father, Edmund Glover, died in October 1860 in Edinburgh. At the time of his death Edmund owned the Theatre Royal in Dunlop Street, Glasgow, as well as the Theatre Royal in Greenock, near Glasgow. Elizabeth, his widow, continued to operate both theatres, aided by her son William Glover and Charles G. Houghton as manager and treasurer. In January 1863, on the final night of the pantomime Blue Beard, the Dunlop Street Theatre Royal was damaged by fire. The theatre was insured, and closed for nearly a year while it was rebuilt behind the facade, including workshops next door at Moodie's Court. The expanded and re-designed Theatre Royal opened on 16 December 1863. The renovated scene-painting room provided three expansive walls, allowing three different scenes to be worked upon simultaneously. The principal scene painters at the theatre were William Glover, Sam Bough and F. C. Fisher.

In about 1862 John Brunton, aged thirteen years, was articled to Glover as an apprentice scenic painter. Brunton spent seven years with Glover in Glasgow, "learning every detail of his profession, and becoming a great favourite with Glover". As well as his artistic skills, William Glover "was an enthusiastic devotee" of both fencing and boxing and instilled a love of these sports onto his young protégé ("who proved no dullard"). As Brunton progressed at fencing "the two scene painters – master and pupil – to show their skill to an admiring world, gave the famous broadsword combat in Rob Roy in public during a revival of that play". This appearance was such a success that soon afterwards they played the Corsican Brothers at a benefit performance, "when the great duel scene was made their special effort". This proved so popular that Glover and Brunton "played the piece for a fortnight – more for devilment and pleasure than for profit".

Glover had a custom whereby each year he took his apprentices "to some selected spot in the Western Highlands, where they encamped for a few weeks, living a delightfully Bohemian existence".

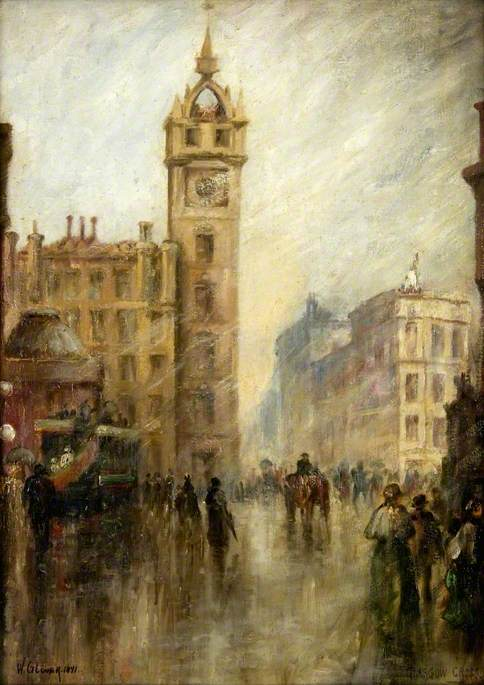
'Glasgow Cross from the Saltmarket' (1971), a painting by William Glover.

In 1869 the Theatre Royal in Dunlop Street was compulsorily purchased by the City of Glasgow Union Railway for the expansion of the Glasgow rail network. The theatre closed in May 1869 and was demolished. The Glover Trustees were compensated by an amount of £11,798 (calculated as the equivalent of three years profit plus the loss of props and machinery). William Glover moved the theatre's company to the new Theatre Royal at Hope Street in the Cowcaddens area of Glasgow. He formed a partnership with George Francis, and they leased a theatre in Hope Street, Glasgow, for ten years from James Baylis. Glover and Francis transferred the Letters Patent to the Hope Street theatre to enable its name-change from the Royal Colosseum and Opera House to the Theatre Royal. Under the management of Glover and Francis, seasons of opera, plays, burlesques and pantomime were staged. The Hope Street Theatre Royal became the main theatre for opera and its pantomimes were reputed to have "the best costumes and scenic effects".

From 1871 to 1878 Glover and George Francis were the lessees and managers of the prestigious Theatre Royal in Grey Street, Newcastle-upon-Tyne. They produced successful pantomimes and introduced the citizens of Newcastle to early works of Arthur Sullivan and W. S. Gilbert, with Richard D'Oyly Carte as stage manager. They also presented Shakespeare's plays with Henry Irving and others. By 1878, however, the cost of the quality productions at Newcastle's Theatre Royal had exceeded the revenue generated and the partnership was bankrupted. Glover returned to Glasgow to focus on management of the Theatre Royal there.

Glover and Francis also leased the newly-built Opera House in Kilmarnock, south-west of Glasgow, which opened for business in March 1875. The drop scene, or curtain, at the new theatre was painted by Glover, depicting "the banks and braes of Bonnie Doon, with a view of the Burns Monument and the River Doon in the foreground". Many of the productions came to the Kilmarnock Opera House directly from the Glasgow Theatre Royal after the runs had ended there. The financial problems associated with the Theatre Royal in Newcastle also affected the running of the Kilmarnock Opera House. In 1880 George Goddard Whyte took over the lease from Glover and Francis.

In 1879 the Theatre Royal at Glasgow was damaged by fire, at which Glover and Francis ended their lease of the building. The auditorium and stage were rebuilt the following year, with the lease taken over by others.

In about 1880 Glover established his own scene-painting workshops and studio in the Glasgow suburb of Port Dundas and continued as the top scenic designer in Scotland.

Glover's wife Emily died in May 1882 at Kilmun, a spa town on the north shore of Holy Loch, opposite Glasgow (across the Firth of Clyde).

William Glover and Agnes Brown were married in 1882. The couple had three children, born between 1885 and 1892.

=== Later years ===
By 1891 Glover and his family were living in Cumbernauld, north-east of the Glasgow city centre.

William Glover died on 23 August 1916 in Glasgow, Scotland, aged 79 years.

== Gallery ==
A selection of paintings by William Glover
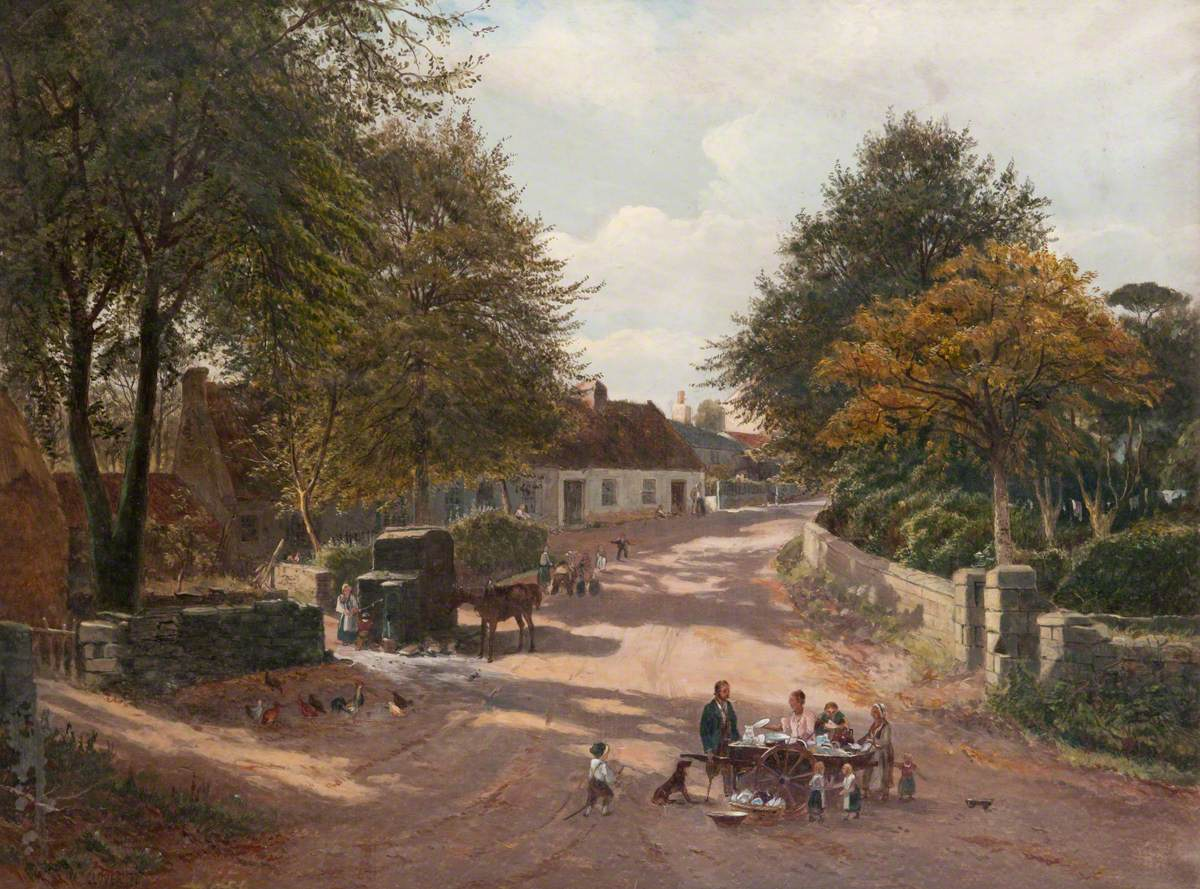
'Meikle Earnock Village' (1871) – Low Parks Museum, South Lanarkshire Council.

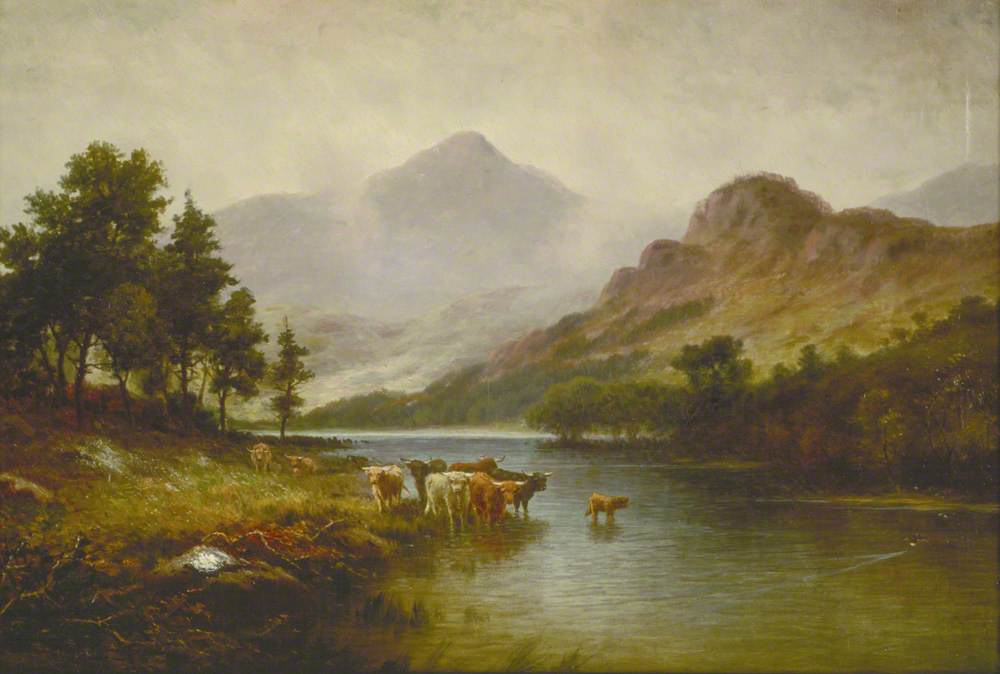
'Highland Cattle in a River Landscape' – Guildhall Art Gallery.

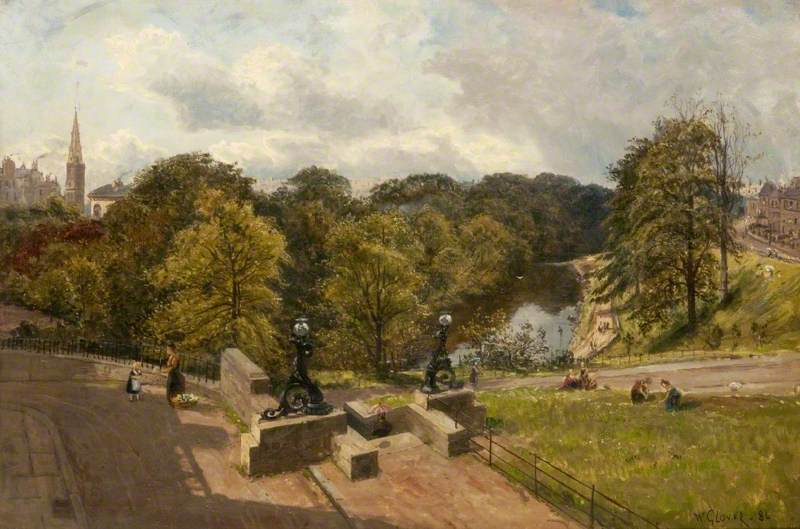
'The River Kelvin from the North at the Botanic Gardens' (1884) – Glasgow Museums Resource Centre.

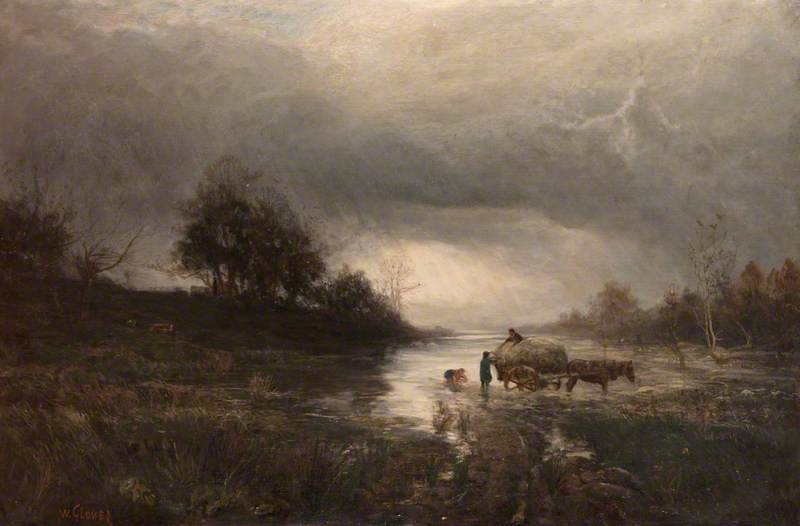
'Storm Approaching' – Paisley Museum and Art Galleries.

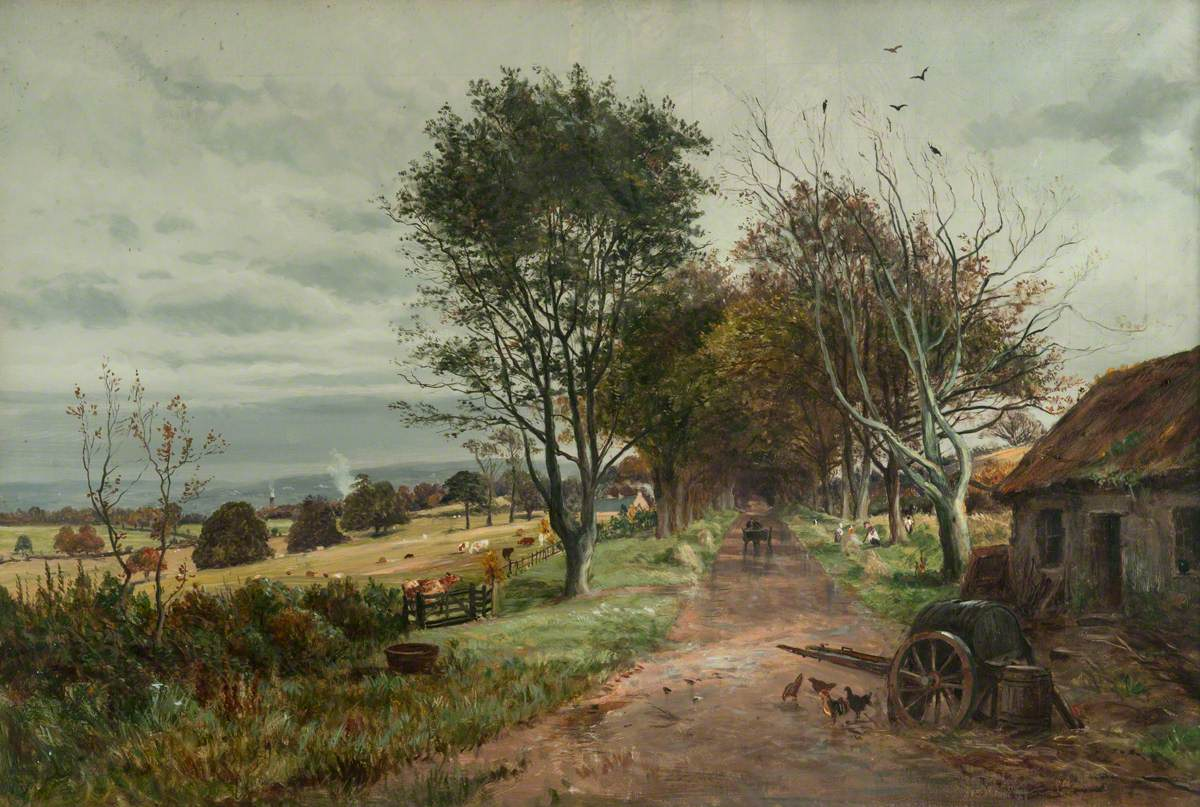
'The Avenue, Neilsland' – Low Parks Museum, South Lanarkshire Council.

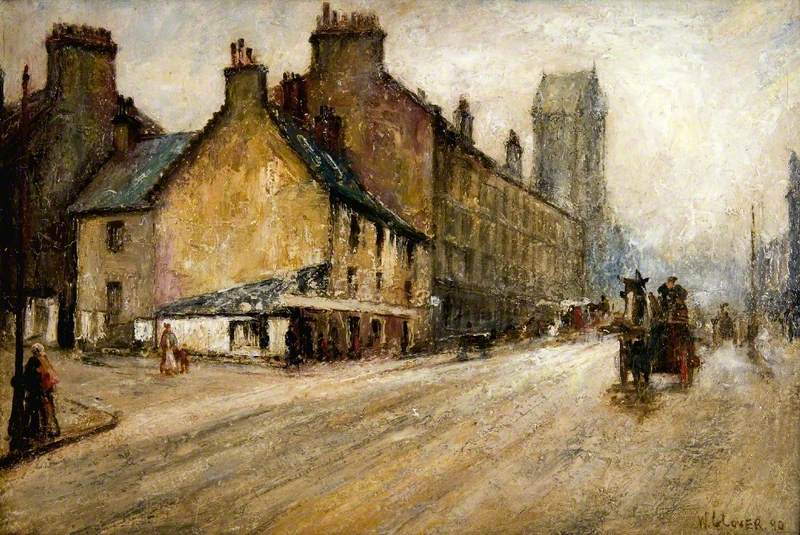
'Castle Street, Glasgow' (1890) – Glasgow Riverside Museum.
