= Catherine Bartho =

Russian ballet dancer

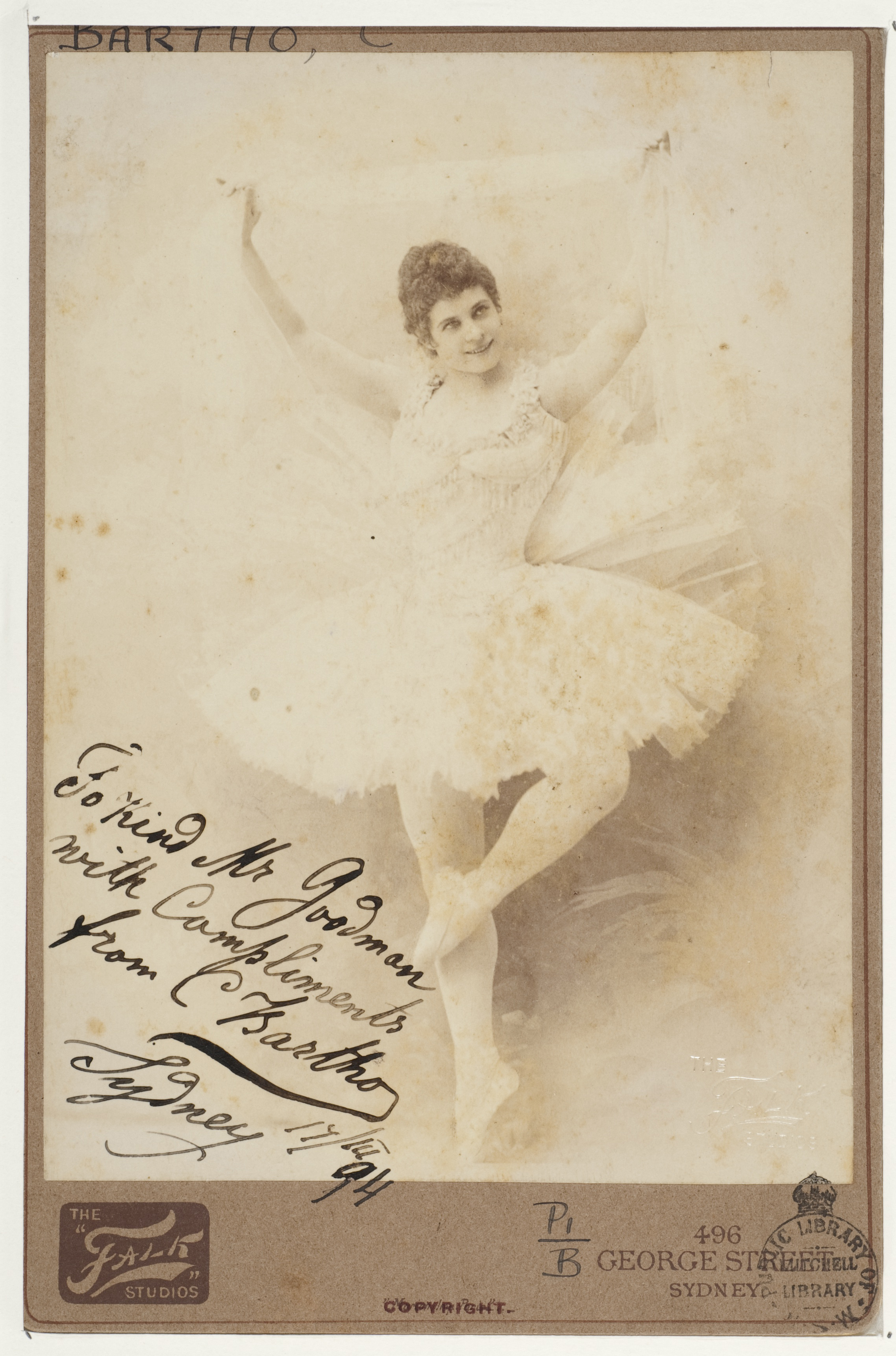
- Catherine Bartho, 1894, by Falk Studio, Sydney
- Born: Catherine Bartho; 1873; Moscow, Russia
- Citizenship: Russian/English
- Education: Imperial Academy of the Arts
- Occupation: Dancer
- Years active: 1893-

Catherine Bartho was born in Russia and trained as a ballerina under Signor Cichette in St Petersburg. She is reputed to be the first Russian ballerina to dance in Australia.

== Life ==
Catherine Bartho was the daughter of an English father and Russian mother. She was born in Moscow in 1873 and was taught at the Imperial Academy of the Arts. Her sister was also a famous Russian ballerina Lidia Nelidova (Bartho). Over the course of 1891-1892 her tutor in St Petersburg was Enrico Chichetti and during this period she appeared in a number of performances including Undine, le Jugement de Paris, Glinka's Roxana and Gounard's Faust.

In 1893, she made her first trip away from Russia when she was brought to Australia by J. C. Williamson and billed as the first Russian ballerina to perform in Australia. She was part of the Entire Grand Opera Company which Williamson introduced to Australia and which consisted of 100 dancers. The two principle artists were Catherine Bartho and Enrichetta D'Argo. In September 1893, Bartho headlined in Turquoisette or ‘A Study in Blue’. This was the first classical ballet entirely conceived, produced and performed in Australia.

Bartho left Australia to perform in San Francisco and Chicago in 1894. While in America she also travelled to New York where she studied at the Alviene Master School of the Theatre and Academy of Cultural Arts, under Claude M. Alviene, who taught among others Fred Astaire. Later in her career she is reputed to have become a burlesque dancer in New York.

== Works ==
- Turquoisette, or A Study in Blue (1893 - ), Australia, 1893
- L'Africaine, Metropolitan Opera, Feb 24 1900, Old Metropolitan Opera House - New York.
- Les Huguenots, Metropolitan Opera Feb 19 1900 - Mar 10 1900, Old Metropolitan Opera House - New York.
