= Howard Vernon (Australian actor) =

Australian actor

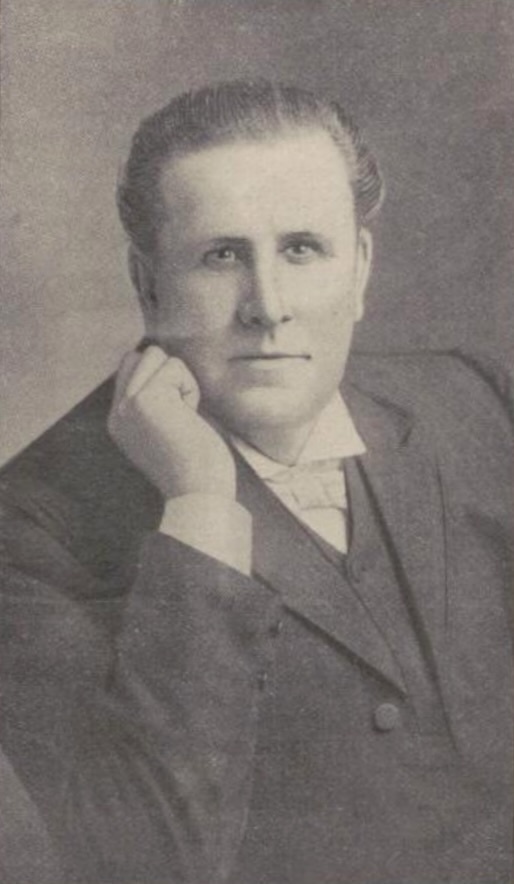
Howard Vernon in 1905

Howard Vernon (20 May 1848 – 26 July 1921) was an Australian actor best known for his performances in comic roles of the Gilbert and Sullivan operas with the J. C. Williamson company.

In 1872, Vernon began to perform in a variety of operettas with several companies, including Alice May's company, in Australia and on tour in Asia and as far away as England and America. He joined the Williamson company in 1881, where he remained for 25 years, playing comic roles. After 1906, he toured and performed, mostly in England, retiring to Australia in 1914.

== Early life and career ==
Vernon was born in Melbourne and grew up in that city. His name was originally John Lett, and he was the son of Richard Prince Lett, a brickmaker who built the "Cricketer's Arms", one of Melbourne's first hotels, and his wife Jane Catherine, née Williamson. He was educated at the Richmond Church of England school, then worked as a clerk at the age of 15 and the next year as a tea-taster and blender. He made his stage debut at the age of eighteen, at Ballarat, Victoria, in a farce, Turn Him Out.

Vernon in 1882

Vernon was a tenor. In 1872–73, he played in a season of opera bouffes in Australia with the Alice May company. In their production of Cox and Box, he played Mr. Box. With that company, he then toured New Zealand and India. In 1874, with the Lyster Opera Company, he was successful as Myles na Coppaleen in a production of The Lily of Killarney.

Wellington's Evening Post said, "Mr Vernon's performance as Myles would suffice to stamp him as an actor of the first order and a very excellent tenor singer." Later that year, he organised a company of his own, Royal English Opera Company, which went to China. In 1876, in Singapore, Vernon helped to produce Gilbert and Sullivan's Trial by Jury, accompanied by the band of the 74th Highlanders who were stationed there. They repeated the production, as well as mounting The Sorcerer, in India. In 1877 he performed in Japan. He later played Ange Pitou in La fille de Madame Angot and Fritz in The Grand Duchess of Gerolstein in England with Alice May's company. He also performed in the United States with Emilie Melville's company in San Francisco.

In Australia he played roles in light operas, including Gaspard in Les Cloches de Corneville and Pippo in La Mascotte. He rose in prominence after beginning to perform in Savoy operas with the J. C. Williamson company, with whom he remained for thirty years. In 1881 he played his first such role, taking over the principal comic part of Major-General Stanley in The Pirates of Penzance. He next played Sir Joseph in the company's revival of H.M.S. Pinafore. He originated the part of Bunthorne in Patience later the same year to glowing reviews. The Brisbane Courier said of his Bunthorne, "Competent judges say that he is the best representative of the part who has ever appeared, and that his appreciation of the grotesque humour of it is better from an artistic point of view than that of the original performer." In addition to Gilbert and Sullivan productions, in 1882, he appeared as Captain Flapper in the comic opera Billie Taylor, and in the title role in Rip van Winkle in 1883.

Vernon's first Ko-Ko in The Mikado was in Williamson's 1885 production. He played Sir Marmaduke in the company's The Sorcerer in 1886 and King Hildebrand in Princess Ida in 1887. The Otago Daily Times wrote in 1887 of his Ko-Ko that he "specially shines in his treatment of those lyrics which depend much upon enunciation and bye-play for their effect." He also finally played the Lord Chancellor in Iolanthe in 1887. The same paper commented, "Nothing could be more refinedly humorous than Mr Vernon's Lord Chancellor. ... His conscientious gravity was alternated ... with a wild friskiness that would have appalled Chancery Lane. His excruciating glance supplied the funny element in the trio 'If you go in'."

== Later years ==
Vernon in later life

Among other operettas and revivals of Gilbert and Sullivan operas, over the next years, Vernon played in Erminie in 1887. He was in the company's first production of Olivette in 1888. In 1889, he originated the role of Wilfred Shadbolt in Australia's first production of The Yeomen of the Guard. In some revivals he played different roles from those he had first played. For instance, in 1889, he played Captain Corcoran in a revival of Pinafore. In 1890, he started the year in a pantomime of Cinderella and later played Squire Bantam in Dorothy. Later in the year, he originated the role of Don Alhambra in the first Australian production of The Gondoliers. A reviewer for The Argus wrote, "He makes every point tell, and he restrains his propensity to grimace, with considerable advantage to the character he assumes, and without diminishing its sombre and saturnine humour."

Vernon as King Gama in Princess Ida, 1906

In 1906 he played King Paramount in Utopia, Limited; the Melbourne Age felt that he was no longer equal to the vocal After that, among many other works, Vernon appeared as the dissolute Duke in La Cigale by Edmond Audran and F. C. Burnand, in 1892. After a brief retirement, he returned to play King Gama in a 1905 revival of Princess Ida. demands of this role, but The Daily News in Perth had no complaint about his singing, and said:

Mr. Howard Vernon as King Paramount had abundant opportunities for the display of humorous passion and perplexity. Those who know him (and who does not?) can imagine how the audience laughed when he made love (unsuccessfully at first) to the high toned English governess, Lady Sophy, or got his Field-Marshal's sword between his legs, or embraced the debutantes at the 'drawing-room' with more than kingly fervor.

Afterwards he and his wife performed in New Zealand, Europe, and the United Kingdom. They returned to Australia in 1914, where he retired from the stage, operating a book shop in Richmond, Victoria. In 1920 the J. C. Williamson company gave a benefit performance of The Mikado for him. He was to have played Ko-Ko, but his health did not allow it, although he attended the performance and made a speech of thanks. He died in Prahran, Victoria, near Melbourne, on 26 July 1921. He is buried in Brighton Cemetery.

At the time of his death, he was writing his reminiscences, which were edited by his widow and published by the Brisbane Courier in 1923.

== Family ==
On 2 February 1870, aged 21, as Norman Letville, he married an actress, Mary Jane Walker (died 12 May 1905) at the Alfred Hospital. They had nine children, but at the time of her death, she was the mother of Richard, Alice, Jack, Lima and Iris Vernon.

- Vernon's son (Note: By his own account, Prince was born Richard Victor Prince Lett in Tokyo (c. 1877), the son of Howard Vernon and the singer Florence Howe. Howe and Vernon were professionally associated from 1872 in the Royal English Opera Company to 1905 in the Norman Vernon Musical Comedy Co.) or stepson, Richard Victor Prince Lett (aka Victor Prince) was an actor. He married Florence ("Tot") Evesson, a daughter of Charles Evesson of Woollahra, on 26 April 1905. They had a daughter, Victoria Prince. He died 2 July 1947. Another reference has him born to Mary Jane Walker in 1879 in Hong Kong.
- Alice Vernon was also a singer and actor in Gilbert and Sullivan operas, appearing as "Miss Esther Castles". She died 16 September 1907.
- Norman Richard Vernon, another son, was perhaps not of Mary Vernon; he was associated with the Howard Vernon company, later manager of the Box Hill picture theatre. He may have been the same person as Norman John Vernon, who died on 7 January 1947, also known as Jack Vernon.
- Lima Vernon was an actress with Maurice Gerald's Dramatic Company.
- Iris Vernon was also a performer.

In 1906, Vernon married the singer and actress Lavinia Florence de Loitte (1881–1962), who was billed as Vinia de Loitte.

== Sources ==
- Simpson, Adrienne (2003). Alice May : Gilbert and Sullivan's first prima donna. New York: Routledge. ISBN 0415937507.
