= Vinia de Loitte =

Australian singer, writer and philanthropist

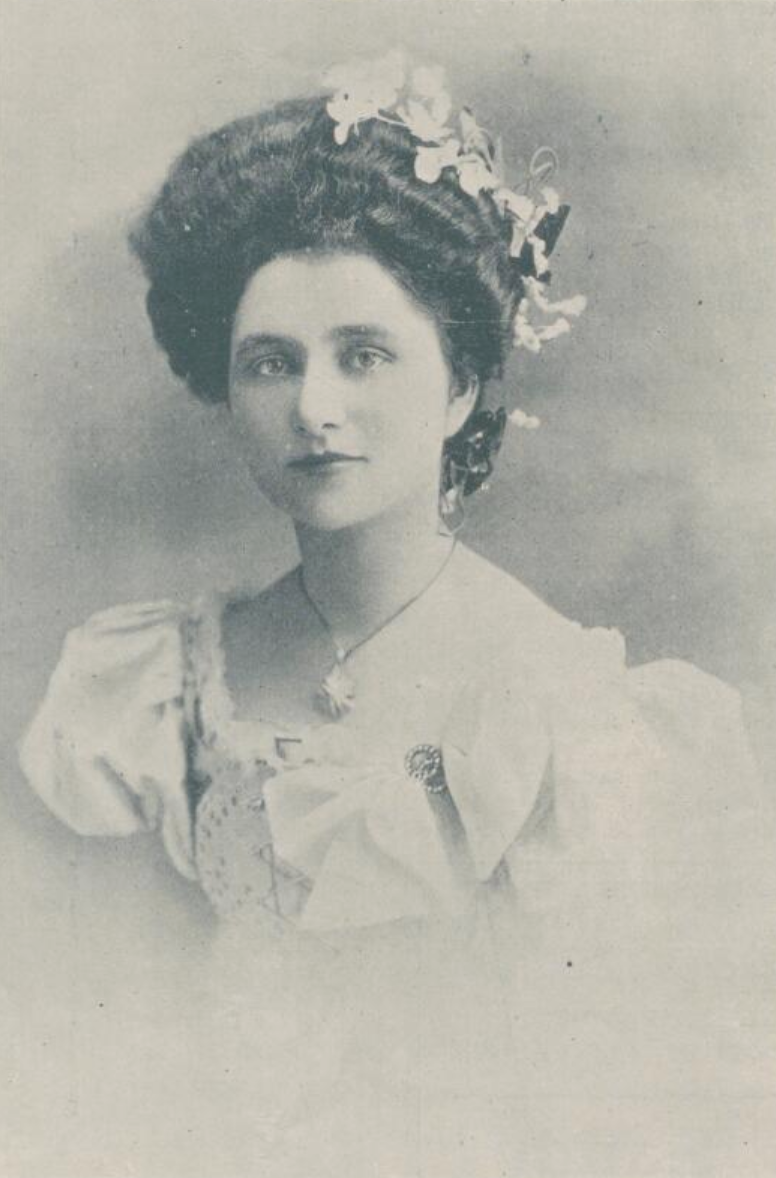
- De Loitte in 1907
- Born: Lavinia Florence De Loitte; 15 March 1881; Balmain, New South Wales, New South Wales, Australia
- Died: 22 August 1962 (aged 81); Balmain, New South Wales, New South Wales, Australia
- Other name: Comtesse de Vilme-Hautmont
- Occupations: soprano, writer
- Spouse: Howard Vernon (1906–1921, his death)

Lavinia Florence de Loitte (15 March 1881 – 22 August 1962) was an Australian Gilbert and Sullivan singer, writer and philanthropist known throughout her career as Vinia de Loitte. She was also known by her title, Comtesse de Vilme-Hautmont.

Born in New South Wales, de Loitte inherited the matrilineal title, Comtesse de Vilme-Hautmont. After some experience performing in an amateur capacity, and despite family resistance, she joined the J. C. Williamson company and began playing roles in Edwardian musical comedy by 1904. In 1906, she married Howard Vernon, and the two toured New Zealand, where they sang opera to accompany the film Robbery Under Arms. For Williamson's, she performed in eleven of the Gilbert and Sullivan operas, and she and her husband performed in Europe for several years, returning to Australia in 1914. She continued to perform professionally until 1927 and later taught singing.

In the 1920s, she began to write, including memoirs, a book about Gilbert and Sullivan productions in Australia and a cookery column. She also raised money for charities and to benefit singers over the years. In the late 1930s she hosted overseas motoring tours of Europe for the Australian Travel Service.

== Early life ==
De Loitte was born at Snails Bay, Balmain, New South Wales, on 15 March 1881. Her mother, Florence Lavinia (née Herbert, but known as Adams) inherited the matrilineal title, Comtesse de Vilme-Hautmont, that had been conferred on a female ancestor who saved Louis XIV from a wolf's attack. Her father, William Henry De Loitte, was an accountant. She was a student of Randall Woodhouse, who was later a professor at the Sydney Conservatorium of Music, and at age 14 she passed the intermediate level of the Trinity College Musical Examinations with honours. In 1901 she won first prize for a soprano solo at the Industrial Exhibition in Sydney.

== Career ==
De Loitte began singing with the Sydney Liedertafel, and she gained valuable experience performing at Goulburn in an amateur capacity. Despite family resistance, she auditioned for J. C. Williamson and was offered a job with his company. Her first professional role was either as Nan in A Country Girl or as Fifi in The Belle of New York (1904), the latter for Williamson's. She spent a year on tour as understudy to Florence Young.

On 8 March 1906 de Loitte married Howard Vernon, and actor more than 30 years her senior, in Sorell, Tasmania. The couple owned a farm that grew vegetables but did not intend to give up the stage. In 1907 she and Vernon toured New Zealand, where they sang opera to accompany Charles MacMahon's film, Robbery Under Arms.

For Williamson's, she performed in many Gilbert and Sullivan operas: The Gondoliers, H.M.S. Pinafore, Iolanthe, The Mikado, Patience, The Pirates of Penzance, Princess Ida, Trial by Jury, Utopia, Limited and The Yeomen of the Guard. In 1909 De Loitte and Vernon gave musical entertainments at the Brussels exhibition. After several years in Britain and elsewhere in Europe, they returned to Melbourne in 1914. She retired from the sage in 1927 and later taught singing. In 1928 de Loitte was a foundation member of the Gilbert and Sullivan Society, established in Sydney, and performed at its first meeting in 1928.

In the late 1930s she hosted overseas motoring tours of Europe in association with the Australian Travel Service.

=== Writing ===
Following her husband's death in 1921, de Loitte edited his reminiscences, which were published in the Brisbane Courier in 1923 as "Howard Vernon's Life". In December 1929 she was reported as having finished a 38,000-word book about her husband's life.

In 1926 she wrote a series, "Gilbert and Sullivan: Some Recollections", for the Sydney Daily Telegraph. It was republished as "Gilbert and Sullivan, Recollections of Savoy Operas", in the Brisbane Courier. This led to her book, Gilbert and Sullivan Opera in Australia: being a short account of the stories of the operas and of their production and revivals in Australia. She regularly updated the book, which ran to at least 20 editions. The Brisbane Telegraph reported that 20,000 copies had been sold by mid-1936.

Towards the end of the 1920s she wrote a cookery column for the Evening News. Her book, One Dog to Another, was adapted for radio and serialised on 2GB in 1943.

=== Philanthropy ===
In 1928 she organised a benefit concert for her former teacher, Randall Woodhouse, at which many well-known singers of the time performed. During the Depression, she hired a hall in Sydney where she staged performances by unemployed actors and singers, with the cast changing each week.

In 1951 she organised concerts to raise money for charity.

== Death ==
De Loitte died at Balmain on 22 August 1962. Her body was donated to the University of Sydney.
