= William Elton =

English comedian, actor and singer

William Elton (1 May 1847 – 27 January 1903) was an English comedian, actor and singer, who played in London and New York theatres and had a successful career in Australia, playing comic opera and pantomime.

== History ==
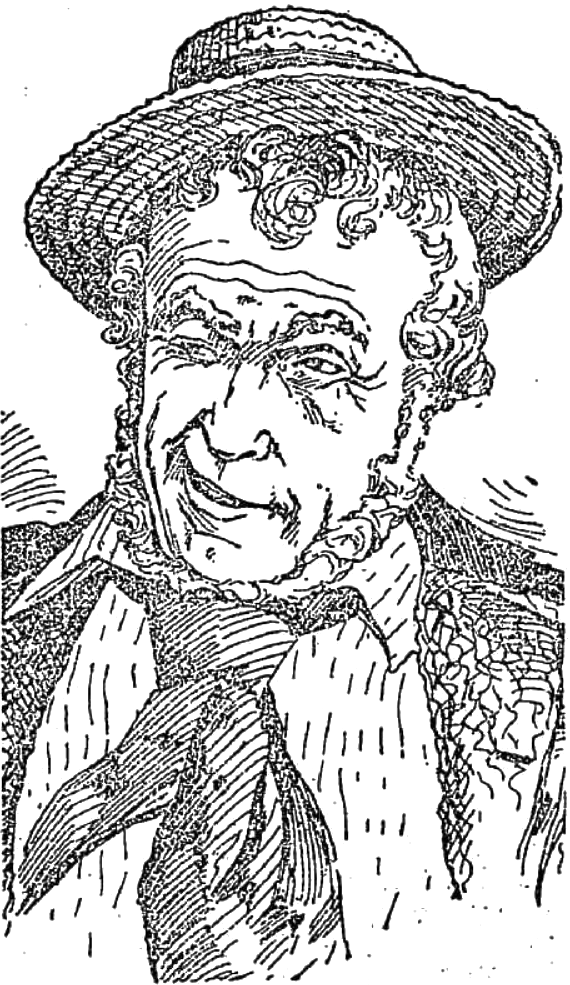
Billy Elton in The Guv'nor

Elton was born William John Shuttleworth (Note: "Shuttlesworth" according to one source.) in Salford, Greater Manchester, son of a surgeon, William Shuttleworth. He was attracted to the theatre while quite young, reportedly appearing at the Adelphi Theatre, Liverpool, at age 10. He spent some of his school years at Scotch College, Melbourne,

By 1867, he was playing comic roles at the Queen's Theatre, Manchester. He toured with Disney Roebuck from 1872 to 1875, then played in South Africa for a year or two, before joining John Hollingshead's company, playing Victorian burlesque, comedy and melodrama at the Gaiety Theatre, London. In 1880 he joined Wallack's Theatre in New York, making his debut as Touchstone in As You Like It. Here he made the acquaintance of scenic artist Phil Goatcher; their paths would cross many times subsequently. He returned to London in 1883, and had several good burlesque roles at the "Gaiety" before sailing off to Australia in 1886 under contract to Williamson, Garner and Musgrove, for whom his first performance was as Mrs Crusoe in a pantomime of Robinson Crusoe.

=== Australia ===
Though a relative unknown in Britain, he became a great favorite in Australia, and attracted good houses wherever he appeared. Elton was known for playing Lurcher opposite Alice Barnett's Mrs Privett (Note: Elton was a diminutive man, and Barnett a statuesque woman; they used their size disparity for comic effect.) in Dorothy, Jack Point in The Yeomen of the Guard, Old Macclesfield in E. G. Lankester's The Guv'nor, Bob Acres in The Rivals, Tony Lumpkin in She Stoops to Conquer, and Ulysses Tinkler in Arthur Shirley's As Large as Life.

He was a keen sportsman, and rode with the Adelaide Hunt Club whenever he was playing in that city. He returned to England in 1892.

=== Last years ===
Elton joined the D'Oyly Carte Opera Company in 1897 and played two seasons with them.

He had plans to retire to Australia, but never followed up. In later years he suffered greatly from a cancerous tumor, for which he underwent surgery in New York.

He died at Blackheath, Kent, aged 55. Another authority, which otherwise largely echoes the D'Oyly Carte history, has him dying at his home on Manor Road, Brockley.

== Personal ==
Elton married Fanny Eliza Lewis in England, on 1 September 1872. Another report has him marrying in Melbourne, but no confirmation has been found. Their children include:

- George William Elton (born c. 1875) was a comic actor also, and successful writer for the stage. He toured Australia with the Hawtrey Comedy Company. On 29 March 1901, in Melbourne, he married Adela Florence Furniss Harrison, adopted daughter of Mrs. Amos Norcott (aka Miss Ida Osborne).
- Fanny Elton, later Fanny Elton Barnard. She may have been the student at Hawksburn College in 1888 who excelled at elocution and had ambitions as a lady of leisure.
- Frank Elton ("still at boarding school" in 1895 so born c. 1880)
