= W. H. Leake =

American actor

William H. Leake (died 15 March 1892) was an American actor who specialised in tragedy and serious drama. His later work was in Australia, where he died.

== History ==
Leake was born at Buffalo, New York, and trained for the ministry, but at age 21 left for the theatre, and is said to have shared the stage with Edwin Booth.

He was brought to Australia by Al Hayman, and first appeared in Melbourne as Joe Saunders in My Partner at the Theatre Royal, on 5 April 1881, and became a public favorite.

He died after a long and painful illness at the Adelaide Hospital, where he had been under treatment for several months. His remains were interred at the West Terrace Cemetery, attended by his wife, who was resident in Melbourne at the time, and Wybert Reeve, amongst others.

The remains of comedian Edwin Kelly (c. 1829 – 3 January 1899) were interred in the same plot, Kelly having also died at the Adelaide Hospital with no funds or time available for a private burial.
