= Rob Roy (play) =

1818 play

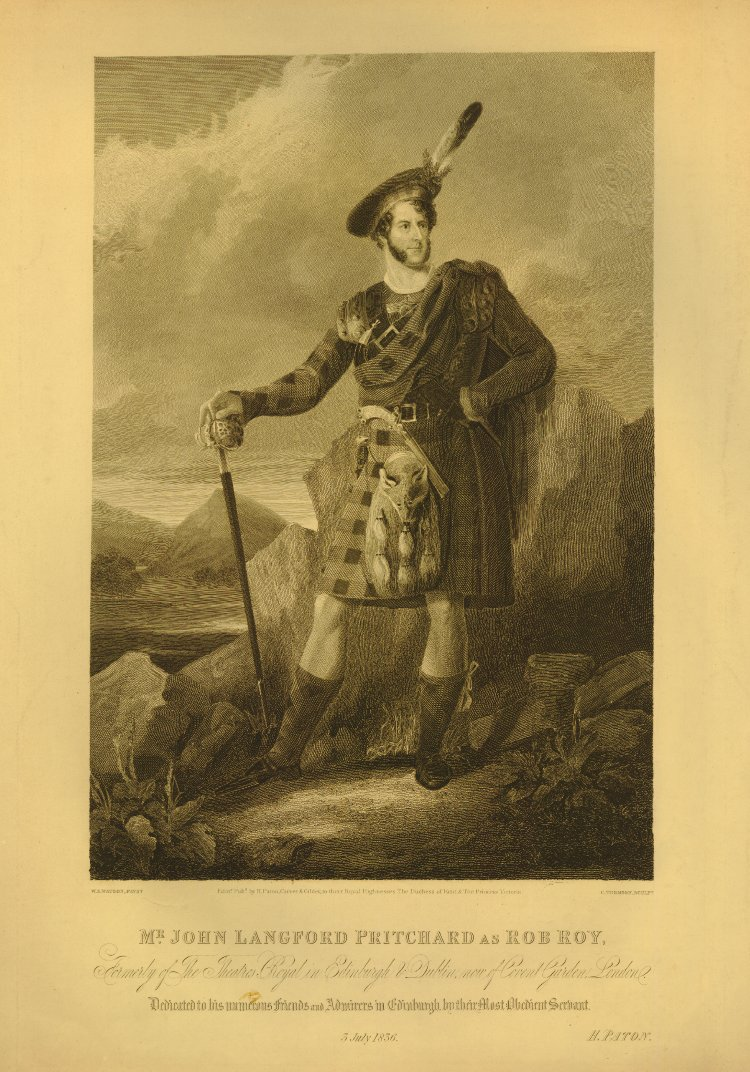
John Langford Pritchard played the role of Rob Roy in 1825

Rob Roy (Rob Roy, the Gregarach) is an 1818 play by English playwright George Soane, based on the 1817 novel Rob Roy by Walter Scott. The play was first performed 25 March 1818 at Theatre Royal, Drury Lane, with a cast including James William Wallack as Dougal.

Another popular stage version of Rob Roy, by Isaac Pocock, performed with traditional Scottish songs, was also premiered in 1818 and frequently revived thereafter.
