= Arthur Garner =

British theatrical entrepreneur in Australian (1851–1934)

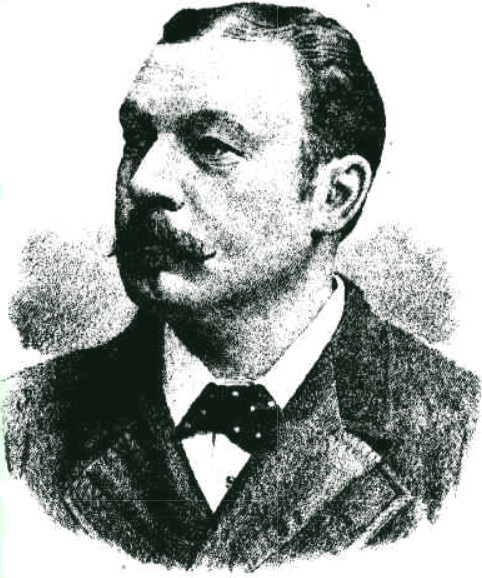
Arthur Garner

Arthur Garner (8 February 1851 – c. October 1934) was a theatrical entrepreneur, active in Australia. He was part of the partnership often dubbed "the Triumvirate" at the time, Williamson, Garner, & Musgrove, between 1881 and 1890.

== Background ==
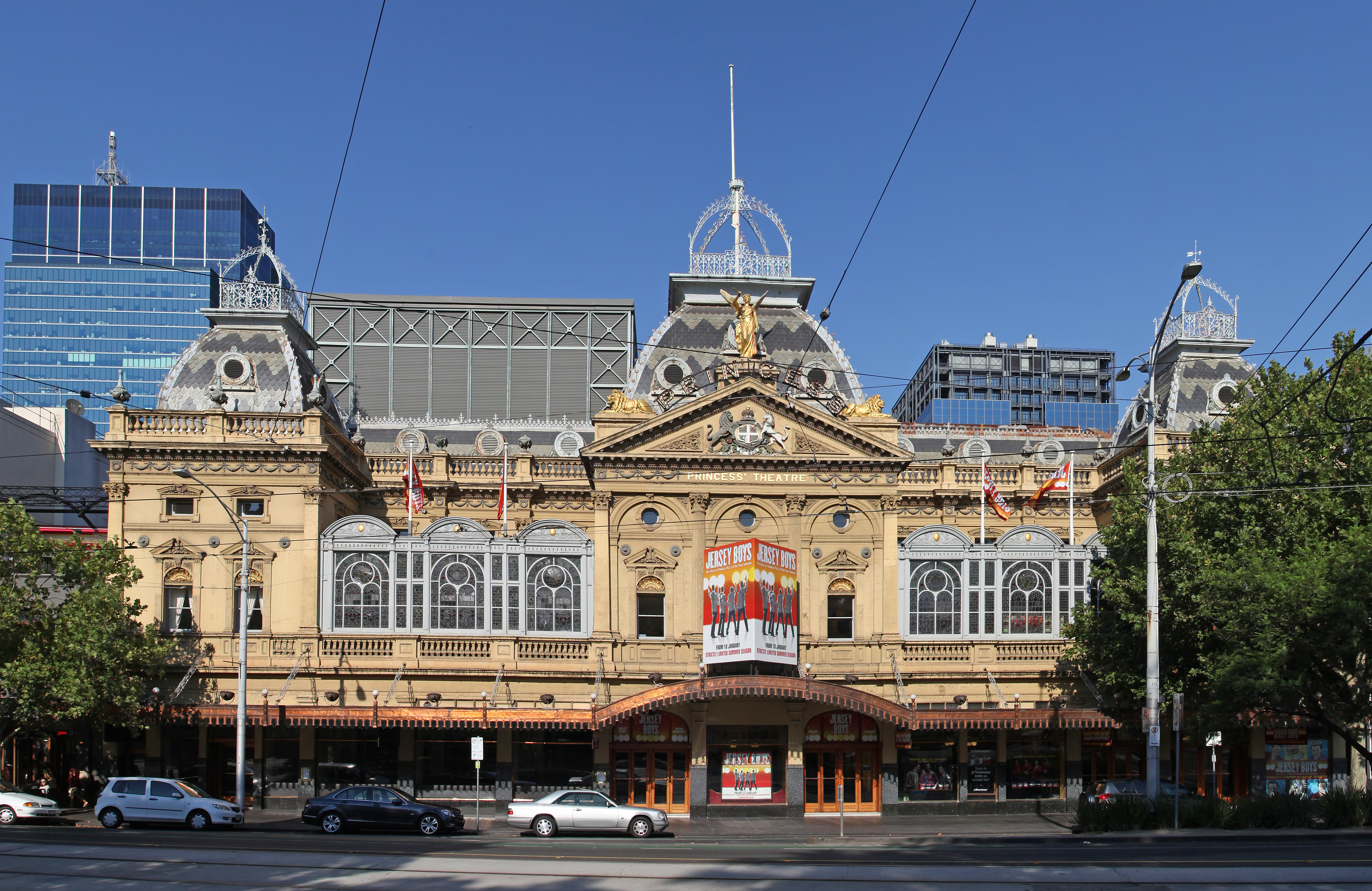
The Princess' Theatre, Melbourne. Built in 1886 by Garner, Williamson & Musgrove

Garner was born in Bath, Somerset, England, where his father, Dr. Jonathan Garner (M.D. of Edinburgh) practised his profession, his mother being a Miss Cobden. Arthur Garner was articled to Charles J. Phipps, the architect, whose connection was largely theatrical, he having erected no less than forty English theatres; from which circumstance may perhaps be traced the young pupil's gravitation to the stage, where he became a protégé of George Gordon, the scenic artist. From the paint-room Garner soon found his way to the footlights, and for some time appeared in various provincial companies.

== Early years ==
In 1873 Garner arrived in Melbourne, returning to London in 1876. In 1879 Garner began his career as an Australian entrepreneur by taking out "The London Comedy Company" (1879), of which Fred Marshall was the bright particular comic star and Mr. George Gordon the hardly less indispensable scenic artist. Garner opened Garner's Theatre (previously White's Rooms) in Adelaide in 1880.

In 1881 Garner joined J. C. Williamson, the eminent Australian–American actor, and George Musgrove in establishing the leading firm of Australasian managers, generally known as the "Trio" or "Triumvirate", which has controlled a greater number of theatres and entered into engagements, dramatic and operatic, on a larger scale than has ever been attempted in the southern hemisphere. The company Williamson, Garner, & Musgrove was officially established in 1882, although the three men had worked together since November 1881 to jointly lease the Theatre Royal, Melbourne and Theatre Royal, Sydney. The company then leased the Princess Theatre in Melbourne, and Theatre Royal in Adelaide (1886). Williamson was the senior partner, and managed the actors and companies, while Musgrove was responsible for production, and Garner the financial side.

Their operations practically commenced at the Theatre Royal, Melbourne, on 1 July 1882, with the production of Gilbert and Sullivan's operetta Patience. Many eminent London artistes were introduced to the colonies under their regime; but the most substantial undertaking of Williamson, Garner & Musgrove was the building of the new Princess Theatre Melbourne, regarded as one of the finest theatres in the world.

The firm was dissolved in 1890 after Williamson and Musgrove fell out, although the two of them formed Williamson and Musgrove two years later, which existed until 1899.

== Married life ==
Garner was twice married: first, to the English actress Blanche Stammers, who died in Melbourne in 1883; and, secondly, to Letitia Hill Martin, sister of Patchett Martin, herself an accomplished littérateur, and formerly a contributor to the Australian press.

They retired to England, living at 36 Kempshott-road, Streatham Common, Surrey. He died sometime before Oct 1934.
