= Walter Brookes Spong =

English painter (1851–1929)

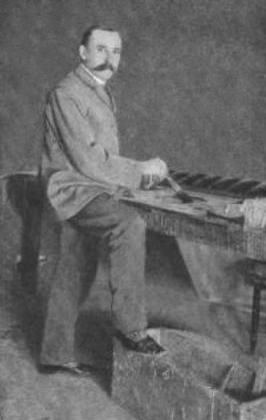
- Born: 1851; London, England
- Died: 2 March 1929 (aged 77–78); Nice, France
- Occupation: Painter
- Spouse: Elizabeth Twedle
- Children: Hilda Spong

Walter Brookes Spong (1851 – 2 March 1929) was an English stage and watercolor painter.

== Biography ==
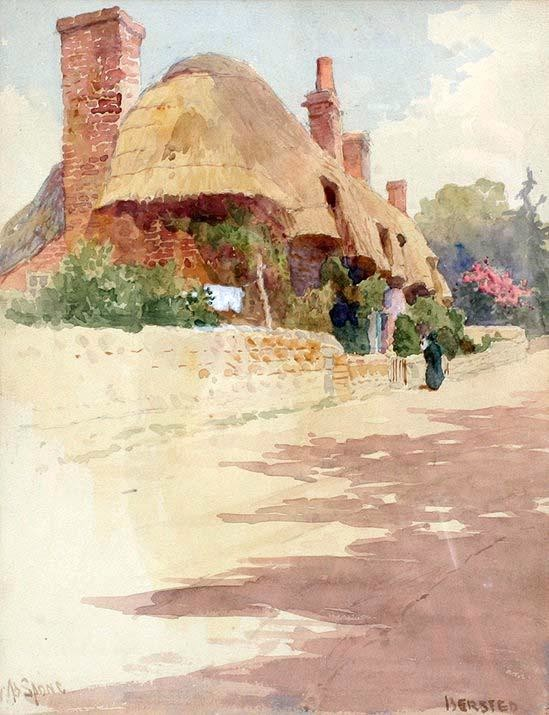
Bersted (1915)

Spong was born in London. He married Elizabeth Twedle, and their daughter, Hilda (1875–1955), was an actress in theatre and movies, working in Australia, Europe, and America. Spong was a friend of noted Australian artists Tom Roberts, and Arthur Streeton.

In 1886, Spong moved to Australia, and became the chief scene painter with the Brough and Boucicault Comedy Company (may have accompanied them to Australia). In 1886, he was one of the founders of the Australian Artists' Association and the Victorian Art Society.

In 1898, Spong returned to England. In 1900, he was listed as a stage painter in the records of the Royal Adelphi Theatre of London.

Spong died in 1929 in Nice, France.

== Exhibitions of his works ==
His works have been exhibited at the Royal Art Society of New South Wales, Victorian Artist's Society (Australia), Society of Artists (Australia), Royal Institute of Watercolour Painters, Royal Academy (8) and Walker Gallery (66) in London, among others.

His works are represented in the Australian National Gallery, Canberra, The Manly Art Gallery, The Mitchell Library, Sydney, and The Dixon Galleries, as well as corporate and private collections in Australia, the United Kingdom, and the United States.
