= J. C. Williamson =

Actor and theatre manager (1845–1913)

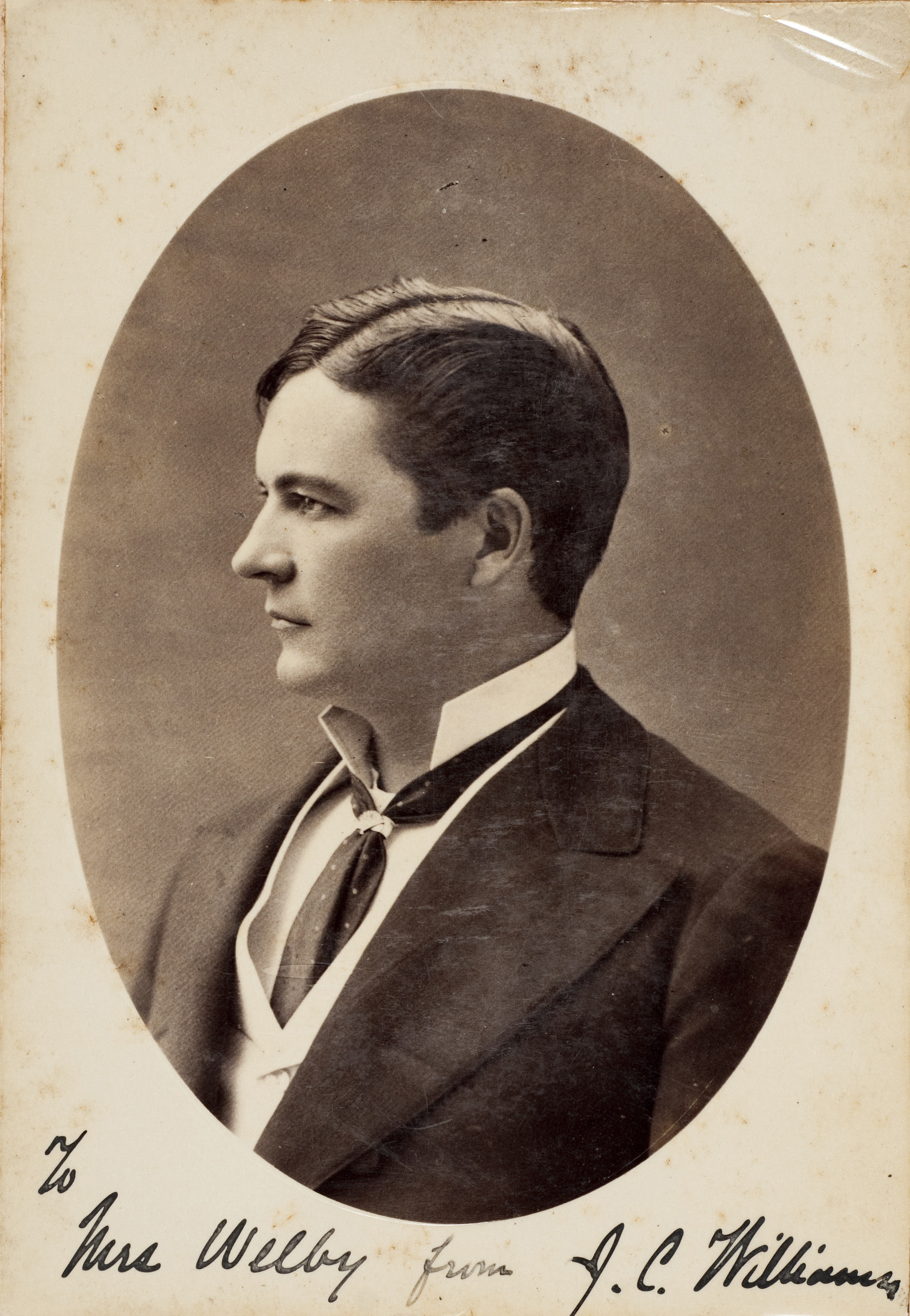
J. C. Williamson, c. 1890

James Cassius Williamson (26 August 1845 – 6 July 1913) was an American actor and later Australia's foremost impresario, founding the J. C. Williamson's theatrical and production company.

Born in Pennsylvania, Williamson moved with his family to Milwaukee, Wisconsin. His father died when he was eleven years old. He acted in amateur theatricals and joined a local theatre company as a call-boy at the age of 15, soon taking roles and eventually moving to New York where he played for several years at Wallack's Theatre and then other New York theatres. In 1871, he became the leading comedian at the California Theatre in San Francisco and the next year married comedian and actress Maggie Moore.

The two found success touring in Australia, and then playing in London, the U.S. and elsewhere in a melodrama called Struck Oil. In 1879, Williamson obtained the right to present H.M.S. Pinafore and then other Gilbert and Sullivan operas in Australia. He soon formed his Royal Comic Opera Company. In 1882, Williamson became the lessee of the Sydney Theatre Royal, and that year he entered into a partnership with Arthur Garner and George Musgrove, expanding to own more theatres such as the Adelaide Theatre Royal in 1886, and bringing famous performers to Australia, such as Sarah Bernhardt, Catherine Bartho and H. B. Irving, and becoming known for spectacular, large-scale productions.

After 1907, Williamson moved his family to Europe and, his old partners having left, he hired capable managers and changed the theatre company's name to J. C. Williamson Ltd. Williamson died in 1913, but he left a strong theatrical empire that became the largest theatrical firm in the world, with extensive film and property holdings. The company continued to produce seasons of Gilbert and Sullivan operas, operetta, musical comedy, straight plays, pantomimes and occasional musical revues, and later grand opera, ballet seasons, and concert tours by visiting celebrity singers and musicians, at the many theatres that it owned or leased throughout Australia and New Zealand. It also toured and presented shows in London and elsewhere. In 1976, the company closed and leased out its name.

== Life and career ==
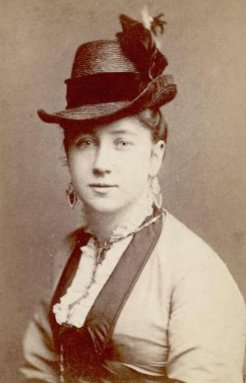
Maggie Moore in the 1870s

Williamson was born in Mercer, Pennsylvania. He was the son of a doctor, James Hezlep Williamson, and his wife Selina. About 1856, the family moved to Milwaukee, Wisconsin, where young James appeared in amateur theatricals beginning in 1857. That year, his father died in an accident.

=== Early career ===
In 1861, Williamson worked for the local theatre company of Messrs. Hurd and Perkins as call-boy, general assistant and scenery and props maker. There he made his official stage debut. He later recalled: "I used to act in amateur theatricals, and when I was sixteen I got an engagement with a company at the Milwaukee theatre. I was full of energy and enthusiasm, and did pretty well everything. My mornings were spent in learning fencing and dancing. In the afternoon I'd look after the box office, and at evening help the stage manager and take my part – sometimes three or four parts." The next year, he joined the Royal Lyceum Theatre in Toronto, Canada and then moved on to New York where he found work as a dialect comedian and then played for several years at Wallack's Theatre. From his seven-year apprenticeship there, Williamson emerged with a thorough knowledge of acting, play production and stage management. He then played in a musical comedy at the Theatre Comique in New York under the management of W. H. Lingard. Although Williamson was not a good singer, his talent for comedy carried him.

In 1871, Williamson was engaged as leading comedian at the California Theatre, in San Francisco, where he met comedian and singer Margaret Virginia Sullivan (known as Maggie Moore) in 1872, whom he married at St. Mary's Cathedral on 2 February 1873. Later that month, they starred together in a melodrama called Struck Oil in Salt Lake City, Utah. Williamson purchased the script for $100 and had it rewritten by his friend Clay M. Greene.

=== Visiting, and then moving to, Australia ===
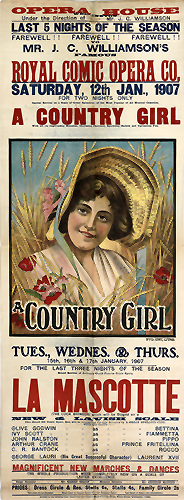
Poster for A Country Girl and La Mascotte, 1907

The Williamsons then visited Australia, travelling on the S.S. Mikado. In 1874, they opened a season at the Theatre Royal, Melbourne, beginning with Struck Oil, which was an instant success. Its run of 43 nights was the longest yet known in the colonial theatre. It proved equally popular around the rest of the country. What was meant to be a 12-week tour of Australia ended up lasting for fifteen months (including Struck Oil and other pieces) and netting Williamson £15,000. Williamson used this money to launch his career as a theatre manager, and Maggie Moore became one of the most popular performers on the Australian stage.

Williamson and Moore played seasons in Australia and toured extensively with several pieces, including Struck Oil, to India, the US, Europe, Britain and elsewhere. Everywhere they went, Struck Oil was a great success. When they opened the play at the Adelphi Theatre in London at Easter in 1876, The Graphic wrote, "Struck Oil is but a poor play; but the acting of Mr. Williamson in the part of Stofel, the Pennsylvanian Dutchman, exhibits genuine humour and pathos." Williamson and Moore later had a bitter divorce, and he tried unsuccessfully to stop her from appearing in the play, which she continued to revive throughout her career; she starred in the 1919 film version in her late 60s.

In 1879, Williamson acquired a one-year exclusive right to perform H.M.S. Pinafore in Australia and New Zealand for £300. They began their 1879–80 Australian season with Struck Oil and staged the first legitimate Australian production of Pinafore at the Theatre Royal, Sydney in November with great success, with the Williamsons playing Sir Joseph Porter and Josephine. Praising the production, Williamson and Moore, the Sydney Morning Herald noted that the production, though "abounding in fun", was dignified and precise, especially compared with a previous "boisterous" unauthorised production, and that many numbers were encored and the laughter and applause from the "immense audience ... was liberally bestowed".

In early 1880, Williamson formed his Royal Comic Opera Company. Williamson then acquired the Australian performing rights from the D'Oyly Carte Opera Company for The Pirates of Penzance for £1,000 and opened that work at the Theatre Royal, Sydney in 1881. Between their appearances in Gilbert and Sullivan operas, James and Maggie Williamson continued to play engagements of Struck Oil along with similar popular favourites, The Danites, Arrah-na-Pogue, The Colleen Bawn and Rip Van Winkle.

=== The beginning of the J. C. Williamson Ltd. theatrical empire ===
In July 1882, Williamson began the leasing the Melbourne Theatre Royal, which was newly renovated, introducing modern technical facilities and lavish sets. This transaction marked the beginning of Williamson's long career as Australia's foremost theatrical manager. After a tour of New Zealand that year, Williamson entered into partnership with Arthur Garner and George Musgrove ("W. G. and M."). This triumvirate was often criticised for creating a monopoly, crushing the old repertory system and discouraging local actors, but it brought to Australia such artists as Dion Boucicault, as well as employing new and local talent such as Nellie Stewart and Howard Vernon. In December 1886, they opened the luxurious new Princess's Theatre in Melbourne with Gilbert and Sullivan's The Mikado.

By 1890, Williamson had hired Henry Bracy as a leading tenor and a stage manager. Bracy subsequently directed numerous comic opera productions for Williamson, also becoming Williamson's chief advisor on casting, working for the company until 1914.

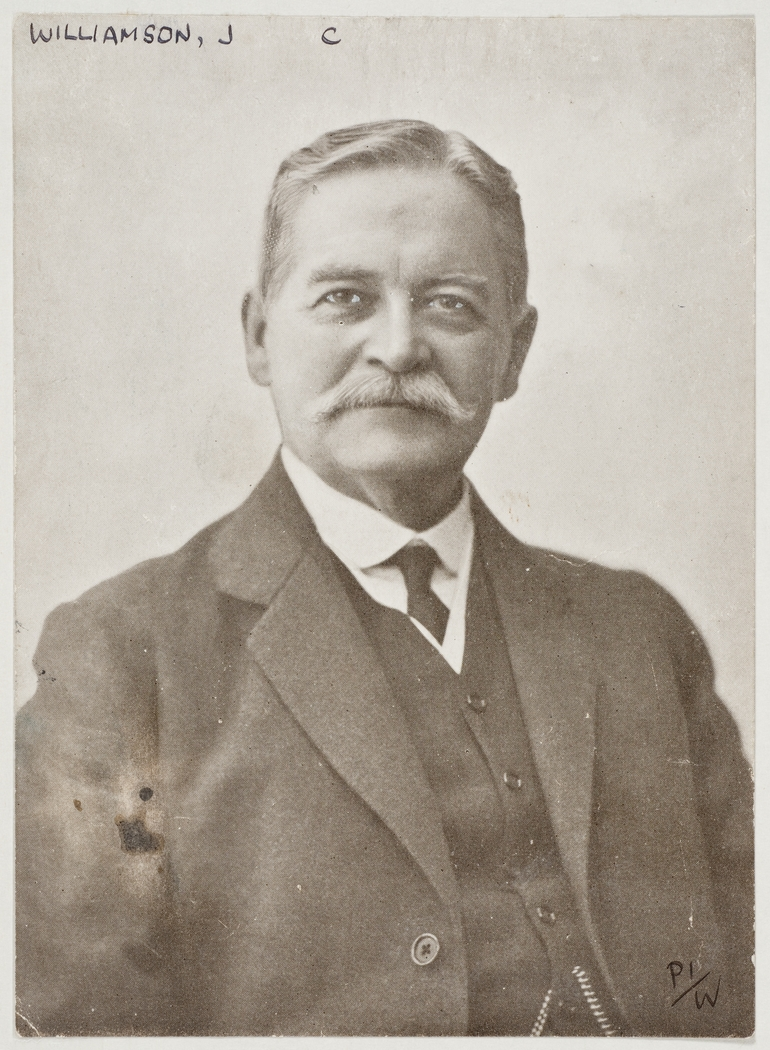
Portrait of J. C. Williamson, c. 1900

The W. G. and M. partnership was dissolved on 4 March 1890. Williamson and Garner formed Williamson, Garner & Co. Musgrove took the Sydney Theatre Royal, while Williamson and Garner held Melbourne's Theatre Royal and Princess Theatre, and Adelaide's Theatre Royal. They had a major success when they brought Sarah Bernhardt to Australia in 1891. At the end of the year Williamson bought Garner out, but Maggie Moore left him for the actor Harry R. Roberts, making extensive financial claims upon him. Musgrove rejoined Williamson in 1892, when they produced the pantomime Little Red Riding Hood, which opened a new "Lyceum" theatre on Pitt Street, Sydney.

In 1896, they broke box-office records with an original Australian pantomime, Djin Djin. Williamson married Mary Alice Weir, a dancer, in 1899, and his partnership with Musgrove dissolved that year unpleasantly. Among other ventures, in 1900 Williamson leased Her Majesty's Theatre in Melbourne, and began a series of extensive renovations and expansions to the theatre that became the flagship venue for Williamson in years to come. He also leased Her Majesty's Theatre in Sydney, and in 1902 mounted the biggest production in its history, Ben-Hur, at a cost of £14,000. With a running time of nearly four hours, the production contained huge choral numbers, marches and a spectacular chariot race, with horses galloping on a treadmill in front of a moving backdrop. The play had premiered on Broadway in 1899 and toured internationally; the Australian version remained popular for years.

A bubonic plague outbreak temporarily closed the theatre soon afterwards, and it was burnt down with huge losses. But Williamson organised a Shakespeare company at the Theatre Royal and rebuilt the theatre in 1903. The next year he entered partnership with George Tallis, his Melbourne manager, and with Gustave Ramaciotti as legal adviser. Visually sensational shows were now 'the Firm's' speciality, and the organisation had grown to employ 650 people.

=== Williamson's later years ===
From 1907, Williamson reduced his managerial work and spent more time with his wife and their daughters Marjorie and Aimée, moving the family to France and spending most of his time in Europe. He also became involved in raising racehorses. In 1910, the company was renamed J. C. Williamson Ltd., with Ramaciotti as managing director.

The company achieved outstanding successes with tours by H. B. Irving and Nellie Melba; the latter and Williamson earned £46,000 profit each from her tour.

Williamson successfully opposed an application by Australian actors to form a union in 1913. In February 1913, Williamson performed in a benefit in Sydney for the widows of Captain Robert Scott's Antarctic expedition.

Returning to his family in France via the United States, his heart condition worsened, and he died in Paris on 6 July 1913 at the age of 67. He was buried, contrary to his wishes, in the Williamson section of Oak Woods cemetery, Chicago, Illinois. He left an elaborately divided estate, valued for probate at £193,010.

== World War I and beyond ==
1921 production

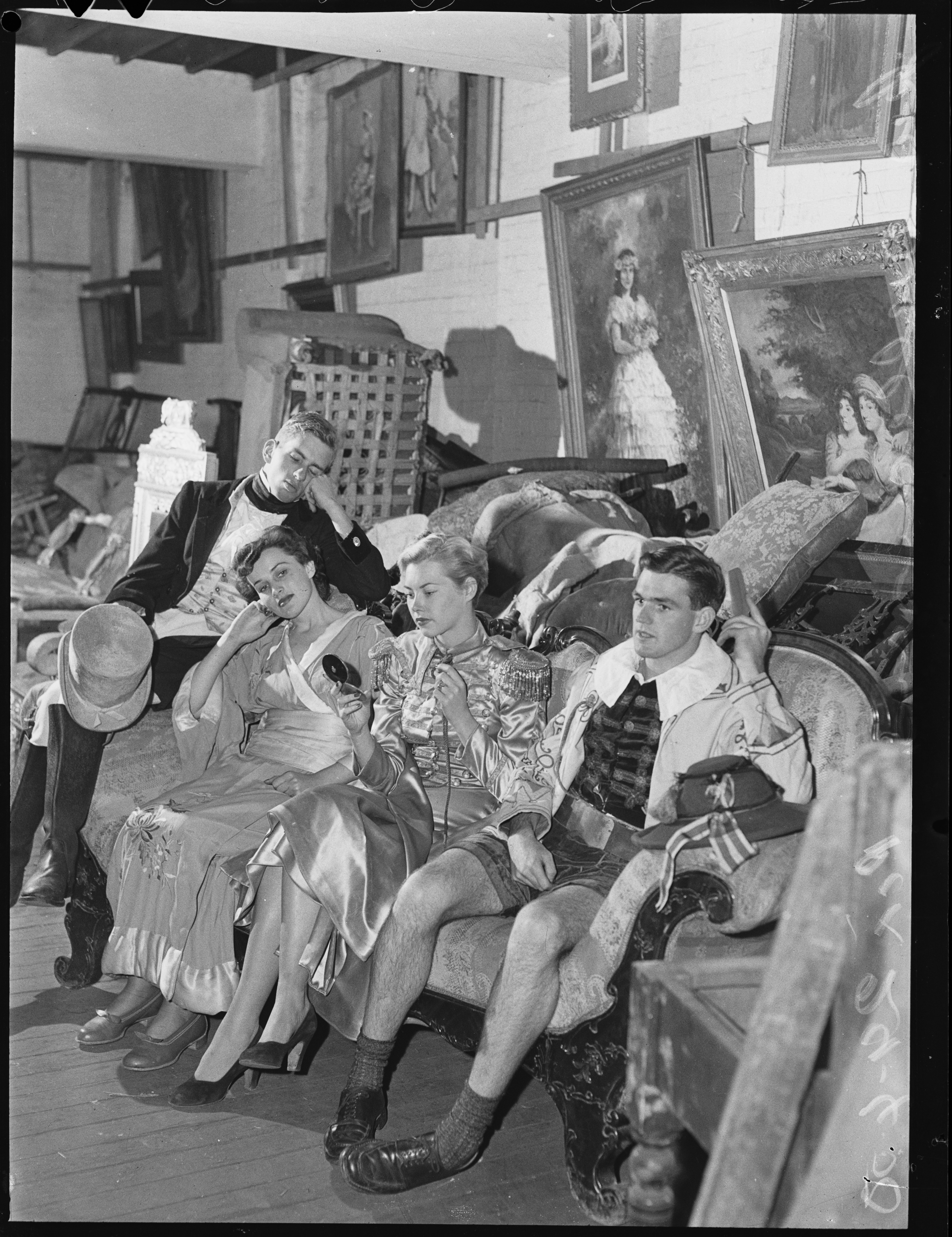
Williamson's props storage room, Sydney, 1941

After Williamson died in 1913, his company – at one time the largest theatrical firm in the world – continued to operate under various managing directors. The firm began to make films and continued to present musical comedy and operetta, including the extremely successful The Maid of the Mountains (1917). In 1941, Viola Wilson, a former principal soprano with the D'Oyly Carte Opera Company who had toured with the Williamson company beginning in 1940, married Frank Tait, one of the company's managing directors, later becoming an artistic director of the company.

In addition to operating its film company and its property and investments company, J. C. Williamson continued to produce seasons of the Gilbert and Sullivan operas, seasons of operetta, musical comedy, straight plays, pantomimes and occasional musical revues, and later grand opera, ballet seasons, and concert tours by visiting celebrity singers and musicians, at the many theatres that it owned or leased throughout Australia and New Zealand until 1976, when the company closed and leased out its name. The company's activities even extended to London's West End, where it produced, among others, seasons of the musicals High Jinks (in 1916), and Mr. Cinders (1928).

== Williamson's Gilbert and Sullivan productions ==
The J. C. Williamson Gilbert and Sullivan Opera Company was a successor to J. C. Williamson's Royal Comic Opera Companies. The company staged touring seasons, initially in Australia, of Gilbert and Sullivan's comic operas from 1879 to 1963. J. C. Williamson Ltd. secured exclusive rights to stage professional productions of the Gilbert and Sullivan (G&S) operas in Australia and New Zealand. The company continued this licensing arrangement with D'Oyly Carte family until the expiry of copyright to the operas in 1961.

Initially the G&S operas were staged by Williamson amongst the repertoire of his Royal Comic Opera Companies, where they shared the bill with seasons of Jacques Offenbach, Alfred Cellier, Charles Lecocq, Robert Planquette and others. Although repertory seasons solely devoted to G&S had been staged at individual theatres throughout Australia from around 1885, the first specially organised G&S tour began in 1905 and played for a year, during which time Utopia, Limited received its Australian premiere at the Princess Theatre, Melbourne, on 20 January 1906. Williamsons toured the operas throughout both Australia and New Zealand in the years 1914–15, 1920–22, 1926–28, 1931–33, 1935–37, 1940–45, 1949–51 and 1956–58, with a final tour by the company in 1962–63. Williamsons also sent G&S touring companies to South Africa between 1913 and 1933 and to India and the Far East in 1922–23, headed on this occasion by C. H. Workman. It was on the return voyage to Australia from this tour that Workman died at the age of 49.

Unlike the D'Oyly Carte Opera Company, the J. C. Williamson G. & S. Opera Co. was not in continuous operation but was organised specifically to tour the operas for a duration of two or more years, depending on how popular the season was with audiences, after which it was disbanded. The company would then be re-formed, after a variable interval of years, for another tour in response to perceived audience demand. During the years of the Great Depression in the early 1930s, the popularity of the G&S company, in fact, helped to keep the firm financially viable when a number of their musical comedy productions lost money. The operas were directed and choreographed by Melbourne-based Minnie Everett. She was believed to be the only woman director of Gilbert and Sullivan at the time, and was one of the first female directors of professional theatre companies in the world.

Many members of the D'Oyly Carte, or former members, were engaged for Australasian G&S tours on the recommendation of the D'Oyly Carte management. Savoyards who toured Australia and New Zealand over the years included Frederick Federici, Frank Thornton, Alice Barnett, Leonora Braham, Courtice Pounds, Charles Kenningham, Wallace Brownlow, C. H. Workman, Frederick Hobbs, Ivan Menzies and wife Elsie Griffin, Winifred Lawson, Richard Watson, Viola Hogg Wilson (who married Frank Tait, the youngest of the five Tait brothers who were then running the company), Evelyn Gardiner, John Dean, Marjorie Eyre and husband Leslie Rands, Richard Walker and wife Helen Roberts, and Grahame Clifford, among others.

In 1925 Sydney Granville, with a number of other D'Oyly Carte principals, sailed to Australia to join the J. C. Williamson Gilbert & Sullivan Opera Company for its 1926–28 tour of Australia and New Zealand, playing the "heavy" baritone G&S roles that he later played when he rejoined D'Oyly Carte in Britain. The G&S operas played in Australasia during that tour were mostly re-costumed in accordance with the D'Oyly Carte designs supplied by Rupert D'Oyly Carte.

In 1949, J. C. Williamson Ltd. brought Granville's wife, Anna Bethell, to Australia to direct its season of G&S operas, which then toured throughout Australasia for the next three years. Bethel was a former contralto with D'Oyly Carte and had served as that company's stage director from 1947 to the spring of 1949. The former Savoyards who participated in the Australia tour included Menzies, Gardiner, Dean, Rands and Eyre, and Walker and Roberts. This tour also marked the farewell appearance of Menzies, who had been principal comedian with the Williamson company for all of their G&S seasons since 1931.

== Legacy ==
In 1989, Williamson was honoured, together with Nellie Stewart, on a postage stamp issued by Australia Post. He was portrayed by Joe McCormick in a 1962 historical "interview" program recounting his life story on Australian television.

The JC Williamson Award is a lifetime achievement award presented by Live Performance Australia (LPA) since 1998 in recognition of "individuals who have made an outstanding contribution to the Australian live entertainment and performing arts industry and shaped the future of our industry for the better", and is the highest honour of the LPA.

== Sources ==
- Bevan, Ian The Story of the Theatre Royal (Currency Press, Sydney, 1993)
- Cellier, François; Cunningham Bridgeman (1914). Gilbert and Sullivan and Their Operas. Boston: Little, Brown and Company.
- de Loitte, Vinia (1935). Gilbert & Sullivan Opera in Australia, 1879–1935 (13th ed.). Sydney: Whitmarks Ltd.
- Gänzl, Kurt. The Encyclopedia of the Musical Theatre, Blackwell/Schirmer (1984) (2 vols, expanded in 2001 to 3 vols.) ISBN 0-02-864970-2
- Dicker, Ian G. J. C. W.: A Short Biography (Rose Bay, 1974)
- Lauri, G. The Australian Theatre Story (Sydney, 1960)
- Murphy, Frank (1949). "Gilbert and Sullivan in Australia". J. C. Williamson Theatres Ltd. Gilbert & Sullivan Opera Season Souvenir. Melbourne.
- Newton, P. J. F. The firm. The story of J. C. Williamson and his firm, Masque (Syd), 1969, no. 8
- Parker, John, ed. (1978). Who Was Who in the Theatre: 1912–1976. Detroit, Michigan: Gale Research Co. Compiled from Who's Who in the Theatre: Volumes 1–15, edited by John Parker, [orig. pub.: Pitman Publishing Ltd., London, 1912–1972]
- Parsons, P (ed.), Companion To Theatre In Australia, Currency Press, Australia, 1995.
- Porter, H. Stars of Australian Stage and Screen (Adelaide, 1965)
- Rollins, Cyril; R. John Witts (1961). The D'Oyly Carte Opera company in Gilbert and Sullivan Operas. London: Michael Joseph Ltd.
- Stephens, A. G. (ed.) J. C. Williamson's Life-Story Told in His Own Words (Sydney, 1913)
- Stewart, Nellie. My Life's Story (Sydney, 1923)
- Tait, Lady Viola Wilson (1971). A Family of Brothers: The Taits and J. C. Williamson; a Theatre History. Melbourne: William Heinemann.
- Wearing, J. P. (1984). The London Stage 1920–1929: A Calendar of Plays and Players — Vol. II: 1925–1929. Metuchen, New Jersey & London: Scarecrow Press.
- West, J., Theatre in Australia, Cassell, Australia, 1978.
