= Knight (surname) =

Origin
- Meaning: "knight"/"serving lad"
- Region of origin: Anglo-Saxon

Knight is an English surname.

== Geographical distribution ==
The name is found in many countries. In 2014, it was ranked 88th in England and 206th in the United States.

== A ==
- Alan Knight (disambiguation), multiple people
- Alanna Knight (1923–2020), British writer
- Albert Knight (cricketer) (1872–1946), English professional cricketer
- Albert Knight (diver) (1900–1964), British diver
- Albert Knight (politician) (1817 – after 1881), merchant and political figure in Quebec
- Albion Knight, Jr., American politician and Anglican bishop
- Amanda Knight, makeup artist
- Amy Knight (born 1946), American historian
- Andrew Knight (journalist) (born 1939), English journalist, editor, and director of News Corporation
- Andrew Knight (politician) (1813–1904), politician in colonial Victoria, Australia
- Andrew Knight (writer) (born 1953), Australian TV writer and producer
- Anne Knight (1786–1862), British-born author, social reformer and pioneer of feminism
- Anne Knight (children's writer) (1792–1860), British children's writer and educationalist
- Anne Knight, pseudonym of American author Rhondi A. Vilott Salsitz
- Annie Knight, Australian sex worker
- Arthur Knight (disambiguation), multiple people
- Ava Knight, American boxer
- Awsten Knight, American singer and musician, member of Waterparks

== B ==
- Barry Knight (cricketer), English cricketer
- Barry Knight (footballer) (born 1945), Australian rules footballer
- Barry Knight (politician) (1954–2026), American politician
- Barry Knight (referee) (born 1960), English football referee
- Benjamin Knight (disambiguation), several people, includes Ben Knight
- Beverley Knight, English R&B artist
- Billy Knight (born 1952), American basketball player and executive
- Billy Knight (basketball, born 1979) (1979–2018), American basketball player
- Billy Knight (criminal) (1943–1978), Canadian criminal and convicted rapist
- Billy Knight (tennis) (1935–2026), British tennis player
- Bob Knight (1940–2023), American basketball player and coach
- Bobbie Knight, American businessperson, academic administrator, college president
- Boogie Knight (born 1999), American football player
- Brevin Knight, American basketball player
- Brandon Knight (disambiguation), several people

== C ==
- Charles Knight (engraver), English engraver
- Charles Knight (publisher) (1791–1873), English publisher and author
- Charles F. Knight, American chairman of Emerson Electric
- Charles Landon Knight (1867–1933), American lawyer and newspaper publisher
- Charles Parsons Knight (1829–1897), English painter
- Charles R. Knight, American dinosaur artist
- Charles Yale Knight, American engineer and inventor of the Knight engine
- Christopher Knight (disambiguation), several people
- Cornelia Knight (1757–1837), English author
- Curtis Knight, American musical artist and band leader

== D ==
- David Knight (disambiguation), several people
- Dennis Knight (born 1968), American professional wrestler best known as Mideon
- Deuce Knight (born 2006), American football player
- Dick Knight (businessman), British advertising executive
- Dick Knight (golfer) (1929–1991), American golfer
- Dick Knight (tennis) (born 1948), American tennis player
- Donald Knight (disambiguation), several people, including Don Knight
- Douglas Knight (1921–2005), American businessman, educator and author
- Duerson Knight (1893–1983), American pilot
- Dusten Knight (born 1990), American baseball player

== E ==
- Edward Knight (disambiguation), several people
- Elise Kellond-Knight (born 1990), Australian association football player
- Elizabeth Knight (disambiguation), several people
- Elliot Knight, English actor in Sinbad, 2012
- Eric Knight (1897–1943), English author and the creator of the fictional collie Lassie
- Esmond Knight (1906–1987), British character actor
- Etheridge Knight (1931–1991), African-American poet

== F ==
- Florence Knight, British chef and columnist
- Frank Knight (disambiguation), several people

== G ==
- G. Wilson Knight (1897–1985), English literary critic and academic
- Gary Knight (photographer), British photographer and architect
- Gary Knight (cricketer) (born 1950), Australian cricketer
- Gary Knight (rugby union) (born 1951), New Zealand rugby union player and amateur wrestler
- George R. Knight (born 1941), American Seventh-day Adventist historian
- Gerald H. Knight, 1908–1979, organist of Canterbury Cathedral 1937–1953, composer, editor
- Gillian Knight, English opera singer
- Gladys Knight, American R&B/soul singer and actress
- Glenn Knight (1944–2025), Singaporean lawyer
- Goodwin Knight, US politician and 31st California governor
- Greg Knight, British politician and MP

== H ==
- Hilary Knight (born 1989), American ice hockey player
- Hilary Knight (illustrator) (born 1926), American writer and artist
- Holly Knight, American songwriter, vocalist and musician
- Howard Knight (politician), American politician from Ohio
- Howard A. Knight Jr., American country music promoter and record producer
- Hyacinth Knight, Jamaican politician

== J ==
- Jabez C. Knight (1815–1900), 8th mayor of Providence, Rhode Island
- Jack Knight (disambiguation), several people
- Jak Knight (1993–2022), American actor, comedian and writer
- James Knight (disambiguation), several people
- Jason Knight (disambiguation), several people
- Jean Knight, African-American soul/R&B/funk singer
- Jerry Knight, American R&B musician
- Jessie Knight (athlete) (born 1994), English athlete specialising in the 400 m hurdles
- Jessie Knight (tattoo artist) (1904–1992), first prominent woman tattoo artist in the UK
- Jill Knight, British MP
- Jim Knight, British politician
- John Knight (disambiguation), several people
- Jonathan Knight (disambiguation), several people
- Jordan Knight, American pop singer
- Joseph Knight (disambiguation), several people
- Jules Knight, English actor and singer
- Julian Knight (murderer) (born 1968), perpetrator of the Hoddle Street massacre in Australia
- Julian Knight (politician), British Conservative Party politician, MP for Solihull
- Julius Knight (1863–1941), English stage actor in Australia

== K ==
- Katherine Knight, Australian murderer who skinned her partner and cooked his body parts
- Keith Knight (cartoonist), American cartoonist and musician
- Keith Knight (footballer), English footballer
- Kelly Knight Craft (born 1962), US ambassador to the United Nations and US ambassador to Canada

== L ==
- Laura Knight, British artist
- Leon Knight, English professional Football player
- Leonard Knight (1931–2014), American builder and architect, creator of Salvation Mountain
- Les U. Knight, founder of the Voluntary Human Extinction Movement
- Laird A. Knight, Founder of 24-hour Mountain Bike Racing, Member Mountain Bike Hall of Fame
- Lon Knight (1853–1932), American baseball player and manager

== M ==
- Madge Knight (1895–1974), English artist
- Maggie Knight (c. 1857–1917), New Zealand actress in Australia
- Marcus Knight, American NFL football player
- Margaret E. Knight (1838–1914), American inventor of the paper-bag-making machine
- Margaret K. Knight (1903–1983), British psychologist and humanist
- Margaret Rose Knight (1918–2006), First Lady of North Carolina
- Marguerite Knight (1920–2004), British Special Operations Executive spy during World War II
- Mark Knight (disambiguation), several people
- Mary Ann Knight (c. 1835–1915), English vegetarianism activist and writer
- Matthew Knight, Canadian actor
- Megan Knight, Canadian politician
- Mel Knight (born 1944), Canadian politician
- Merald "Bubba" Knight, American R&B/soul singer
- Michael Knight, the protagonist from Knight Rider

== N ==
- Newton Knight, pro-Union rebel against the Confederacy in the U.S. Civil War
- Nick Knight (disambiguation), several people

== O ==
- Ora Willis Knight (1874–1913), American chemist and naturalist

== P ==
- Pedro Knight, Cuban musician and the husband of Celia Cruz
- Peter Knight (disambiguation), several people
- Phil Knight (born 1938), American businessman, co-founder and ex-CEO of Nike
- Phil Knight (disambiguation), several people
- Philip Knight (cricketer), English cricketer
- Phillip Knight (footballer), Australian footballer

== Q ==
- Quinton Knight, American football player
- Qwuantrezz Knight, American football player

== R ==
- R. J. B. Knight, British naval historian
- Ray Knight, American major league baseball player
- Reginald Knight (died 1969), Rhodesian politician and judge.
- Richard Payne Knight (1750–1824), English archæologist and philologist
- Robert Knight (disambiguation), several people
- Roger Knight, English cricketer, administrator, and schoolmaster
- Rosalind Knight (1933–2020), British actress

== S ==
- Samantha Knight (born 1997), Australian female murder victim
- Sammy Knight, American NFL football player
- Samuel Knight (disambiguation), several people
- Sarah Kemble Knight (1666–1727), American preacher and traveler
- Sharon Knight (musician), American Celtic/Rock singer and front person of Pagan rock band Pandemonaeon
- Shirley Knight (1936–2020), American actress
- Shirley Knight (Canadian actress) (1936–2009), Canadian actress
- Spencer Knight, American ice hockey goaltender
- Sterling Knight, American actor and singer
- Steve Knight (disambiguation), several people
- Suge Knight, American hip hop music industry entrepreneur

== T ==
- T. R. Knight, American actor
- Ted Knight (1923–1986), American actor
- Ted Knight (politician) (1933–2020), British politician who led Lambeth Council in London
- Terry Knight, American rock music producer, promoter, singer, songwriter and radio personality
- Thomas Knight (disambiguation), several people
- Tonya Knight, American professional female body builder
- Travis Knight (basketball), American NBA basketball player
- Trevor Knight (born 1993), American football player
- Tuesday Knight, American actress

== V ==
- Valentine Knight, 17th-century British army officer, proponent of a grid-based street layout for fire-ravaged London
- Vivien Knight (1953–2009), British art historian and gallerist
- Vicky Knight, English film actress

== W ==
- Wayne Knight, American actor
- William Knight (martyr) (1572–1596), English Catholic martyr
- William Knight (royal servant), member of the court of Henry VIII
- William Angus Knight (1836–1916), British writer
- William Henry Knight (1823–1863,) English portrait and genre painter
- William J. Knight, American X-15 pilot and politician
- Wyatt Knight, American actor
- Wyndham Charles Knight KCIE (1863–1942), British general

== Z ==
- Zat Knight, English football player
- Zonovan Knight (born 2001), American football player
