= John Knight =

John Knight may refer to:

== Sports ==
- John Knight (baseball) (1885–1965), American baseball player
- John Knight (cricketer) (born 1958), English cricketer
- John Knight (footballer) (1902–1990), English footballer

== Politicians ==
- John Knight, English name of Zhou Enlai, first Premier of the People's Republic of China
- John Knight (MP for Reigate, 1417), MP for Reigate
- John Knight (died 1550), MP for Ludgershall
- John Knight (died 1566), MP for Hythe
- John Knight (MP for Lymington) (died 1621), MP for Lymington
- John Knight (died 1683) (1612–1683), English MP for Bristol, 1660–1681
- John Knight (died 1708), English MP for Weymouth and Melcombe Regis (UK Parliament constituency)
- John Knight (died 1718), English MP for Bristol, 1685–1691
- John Knight (died 1733) (c. 1686–1733), MP for St Germans and Sudbury, son of John Knight died 1708
- John Knight (Australian politician) (1943–1981), Australian Senator for Australian Capital Territory, 1975–1981
- John H. Knight (politician) (1836–1903), American politician from Wisconsin
- John Knight (Alabama politician) (born 1945), American politician from Alabama
- John Knight (Nebraska politician), American politician from Nebraska

== Others ==
- John Knight (artist) (born 1945), American conceptual artist
- John Knight (Exmoor pioneer) (1765–1850), moorland reclaimer
- John Knight (judge) (1871–1955), former judge of the United States District Court for the Western District of New York
- John Knight (Royal Navy officer) (1747–1831), Royal Navy admiral
- John Knight (seafarer) (died 1606), English explorer of Greenland and Labrador
- John Knight (slave trader) (1708–1774), English slave trader
- John Knight (soap maker) (1792–1864), Founder of The Royal Primrose Soap Works
- John A. Knight (1931–2009), general superintendent of the Church of the Nazarene
- John Buxton Knight (1843–1908), English landscape painter
- John Franklin Knight or James Wright (1927–2022), Australian medical professional
- John Gally Knight (c. 1740–1804), English barrister
- John George Knight (1826–1892), administrator of the Northern Territory
- John Henry Knight (inventor) (1847–1917), engineer, landowner and inventor
- John James Knight (1863–1927), Australian journalist
- John "Julius" Knight, American house music producer, remixer and DJ
- John Lowden Knight (1915–2001), professor, university administrator, and Methodist theologian
- John Prescott Knight (1803–1881), English portrait painter
- John R. Knight, professor of pediatrics at Harvard Medical School
- John S. Knight (1894–1981), newspaper publisher and editor
- John Knight (died 1931), estate agent, co-founder of Knight Frank
- John Knight, former drummer of the California punk rock band D.I.

== See also ==
- Jack Knight (disambiguation)
- Jonathan Knight (disambiguation)
