= Anne Knight (disambiguation) =

Anne Knight (1786–1862) was an English social reformer.

Anne Knight may also refer to:

- Anne Knight (children's writer) (1792–1860), Quaker children's writer and educationalist
- Rhondi A. Vilott Salsitz (born 1949), American writer who uses Anne Knight as a pseudonym

== See also ==
- Knight (surname)
