= Charles Knight =

Charles Knight may refer to:

- Charles Knight (engraver) (1743–c. 1827), English engraver
- Charles Knight (publisher) (1791–1873), English author and publisher
- Charles Knight (New Zealand doctor) (1808–1891), New Zealand doctor, public servant and botanist
- Charles Parsons Knight (1829–1897), English painter
- Charles H. Knight (1839–1904), American soldier and recipient of the Medal of Honor
- Charles Knight (civil servant) (1863–1941), British civil servant
- C. L. Knight (Charles Landon Knight, 1867–1933), American lawyer, publisher and United States Representative from Ohio
- Charles Yale Knight (1868–1940), American engineer, inventor of the Knight engine
- Charles R. Knight (1874–1953), American artist who specialized in dinosaur paintings
- Charles Knight (artist) (1901–1990), British landscape painter
- Charles Joseph Knight (born 1931), Canadian surgeon general
- Charles T. Knight (1931–2023)), American sound engineer
- Charles F. Knight (1936–2017), American businessman, chairman of Emerson Electric
- Charles Ray Knight (born 1952), American former Major League Baseball player
- Charles Knight (cardiologist), cardiologist and chief executive of St Bartholomew's Hospital
- Charles Knight (filmmaker) (born 1967), New Zealand filmmaker, actor and stuntman
