= Alan Knight =

Alan Knight may refer to:

- Alan Knight (professor of journalism) (1949–2017), Australian academic and professor of journalism and media studies
- Alan Knight (Australian footballer) (1936–2020), Australian rules footballer
- Alan Knight (bishop) (1904–1979), Bishop of Guyana and Primate of the West Indies
- Alan Knight (footballer, born 1961) (1961–2026), English footballer
- Alan Knight (historian) (born 1946), British academic historian of Latin America studies at St. Antony's College Oxford, specialist in the history of Mexico
- Alan Edgar Knight (1931–2015), American medievalist and scholar of French literature
