= James Knight =

James or Jim Knight may refer to:

== People ==
=== Born before 1900 ===
- James Knight (explorer) (c.1640–c.1720), English explorer and director of the Hudson's Bay Company in America
- James Knight (actor) (1891–1948), British actor
- James Knight (Australian politician) (c. 1826–1876), member of the Victorian Legislative Council
- James Knight (coach) (1875–1969), American football coach active 1902–1904
- James H. Knight (1892–1945), American pilot
- James Knight (architect) (1867–1930), British architect
- James Knight (golfer), Scottish amateur golfer

=== Born after 1900 ===
- James L. Knight (1909–1991), American newspaper publisher
- James A. Knight (1918–1998), psychiatrist, theologian, and medical ethicist
- Jim Knight (footballer) (1918–1943), Australian rules footballer
- James W. Knight (1925–2005), American Presbyterian minister
- James Knight (diplomat) (born 1948), United States Ambassador to Chad
- Jim Knight (born 1965), British politician

== Places ==
- James L. Knight Center, concert hall in Miami, USA
- John S. and James L. Knight Foundation, American non-profit foundation

== See also ==
- Knight (surname)
