= Tashina Morris =

Alabama politician

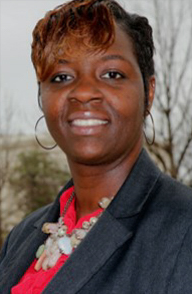

Member of the Alabama House of Representatives from the 77th district
- Incumbent
- Assumed office November 7, 2018
- Preceded by: John Knight

Personal details
- Party: Democratic
- Education: Amridge University (MS); Capella University (PhD)

Tashina Morris is an American politician and former cosmetologist serving as a member of the Alabama House of Representatives from the 77th district. She assumed office on November 7, 2018. She is a member of the Democratic Party.

== Education ==
Morris earned a Master of Science in leadership management from Amridge University and a Ph.D. in criminal justice and safety studies from Capella University.

== Career ==
Morris worked as a cosmetology instructor and floor manager at Virginia College and a program director at the SouthEastern School of Cosmetology. She has since worked as a nonprofit director. Morris was elected to the Alabama House of Representatives and assumed office on November 7, 2018, succeeding John Knight. Morris was a candidate for the Alabama Senate in November 2020, placing fourth in the Democratic primary.
