= Llandough =

Llandough may refer to the following places in the Vale of Glamorgan, Wales:

- Llandough, Llanfair, near Cowbridge
- Llandough, Penarth, near Cardiff
- Llandow, near Wick
