= Barry Knight =

Barry Knight is the name of:

- Barry Knight (cricketer) (1938–2025), English cricketer
- Barry Knight (referee) (born 1960), English football referee
- Barry Knight (politician) (1954–2026), American politician
- Barry Knight (footballer) (born 1945), Australian rules footballer
