= Robert Knight =

Robert, Rob, Bob, or Bobbie Knight may refer to:

== Politics ==
- Robert Knight, 1st Earl of Catherlough (1702–1772), Earl of Catherlough and MP for Great Grimsby, Milborne Port and Castle Rising
- Robert Knight (MP, born 1768) (1768–1855), Member of Parliament (MP) for Wootton Bassett, for Rye, and for Wallingford
- Robert G. Knight (born 1941), former mayor of Wichita, Kansas
- Rob Knight (politician) (born 1967), Australian politician
- Robert Knight or Roy Knight (politician) (1891–1971), member of the Canadian House of Commons

== Science ==
- Robert P. Knight (1902–1966), American psychoanalyst
- Robert T. Knight, American neurologist
- Bob Knight (psychologist) (born 1950), American psychologist
- Rob Knight (biologist) (born 1976), American biologist

== Sports ==
- Robert Knight (cricketer, born 1858) (1858–1938), Welsh cricketer and barrister
- Robert Knight (cricketer, born 1879) (1879–1955), English cricketer
- Robert Knight (cricketer, born 1957), Australian cricketer
- Bob Knight (1940–2023), American college basketball coach
- Bob Knight (basketball, born 1929) (1929–2008), American professional basketball player
- Bobby Knight, an early ring name of American professional wrestler Mo (Robert Lawrence Horne, 1967–2025)

== Others ==
- Bobbie Knight, American businessperson, academic administrator and college president
- Robert Knight (editor) (1825–1890), founding editor of The Times of India and The Statesman
- Robert Knight (industrialist) (1826–1912), Rhode Island manufacturer, founder of Fruit of the Loom
- Robert Knight (musician) (1940–2017), American singer
- Robert Knight (trade unionist) (1833–1911), British leader of the Boilermakers trade union
- Robert H. Knight (born 1951), American conservative activist
- Robert K. Knight (1957–2024), American college president
- Robert M. Knight, American photographer
- Robert Knight (journalist) (1949–2014), American radio journalist (see List of George Polk Award winners)

== See also ==
- Robert Knights (born 1942), British director
