= Francis Stacey =

Welsh-born law officer and cricketer

Personal information
- Full name: Francis Edmund Stacey
- Born: 18 August 1830; Llandaff, Glamorgan, Wales
- Died: 3 October 1885 (aged 55); Llandough Castle, Glamorgan, Wales
- Batting: Unknown
- Bowling: Unknown
- Role: Wicket-keeper

Domestic team information
- Years: Team
- 1850–1853: Cambridge University
- 1855–1863: Marylebone Cricket Club

Career statistics
Competition	First-class
Matches	15
Runs scored	241
Batting average	12.05
100s/50s	–/1
Top score	89
Balls bowled	60
Wickets	7
Bowling average	54.00
5 wickets in innings	–
10 wickets in match	–
Best bowling	4/?
Catches/stumpings	7/6
- Source: Cricinfo, 26 January 2023

Francis Edmund Stacey (18 August 1830 – 3 October 1885) was a Welsh-born law officer and a cricketer who played first-class cricket in 15 matches for Cambridge University, the Marylebone Cricket Club (MCC) and the Gentlemen of England side. He was born at Llandaff, Cardiff and died at Llandough Castle, Llandough, Glamorgan.

Stacey was educated at Eton College and King's College, Cambridge; entry to King's was, in Stacey's time there, restricted to people educated at Eton. He played cricket for Cambridge University as a lower-order batsman and wicketkeeper; it is not known whether he was right- or left-handed, and he did not keep wicket in every match in which he played. His most successful game for the university side was the 1853 University Match against Oxford University, in which he batted at No 10 for Cambridge and top-scored with 38, though the match was lost by an innings. Stacey's cricket after 1853 was fairly intermittent, but in 1859 he made the highest score of his first-class career, 89, playing for a Gentlemen of England side against the Gentlemen of Kent.

Stacey graduated from Cambridge University with a Bachelor of Arts degree in 1854, and this was automatically converted to a Master of Arts in 1857. He remained as a Fellow of King's College until 1863, but also qualified as a lawyer, being called to the bar in 1857 and thereafter practising on the South Wales circuit. He married Theodosia, daughter of Charles Tyndall of Bristol, in 1862 and the marriage, with a subsequent legacy, made him extremely wealthy. Buying Llandough Castle near Cowbridge in Glamorgan, he served as High Sheriff of Glamorgan in 1873 and was also a justice of the peace and a deputy lieutenant for the county.

Stacey's wealth enabled him to become a generous philanthropist and benefactor, and he put up the money and contributed to the design of the stained glass in the great west window of King's College Chapel, Cambridge in 1879, which had been left plain when the chapel's other stained-glass windows were constructed in the 16th century. In an article in The Spectator in 2003, Stacey's great-great-nephew, the writer and journalist Tom Stacey, wrote that the donation of the window, which depicts Doom, was considered within the family to have been a penance for Francis Stacey's dissolute lifestyle while at Cambridge. The article states that Stacey felt especial remorse over an incident in which, in advance of his own marriage, he bequeathed his town "girl-friend" to another King's Fellow, named Ridler – Fellows of King's College were expected to be celibate – but that Ridler had subsequently died in the girl-friend's bed; Stacey had been involved in a subterfuge which saw the dead Ridler returned to King's, where the body was "discovered" the following morning dead in his own bed.
