= Storybook =

Storybook most often refers to children's literature.

Storybook may also refer to:

== Arts, entertainment, and media ==
=== Literature ===
- Disney's Animated Storybook, a 1995 series of point-and-click interactive storybooks
- Interactive storybook, a children's story packaged with animated graphics, sound or other interactive elements
- Shirley Temple's Storybook, a U.S. TV series
- The Jesus Storybook Bible, a children's Bible written by Sally Lloyd-Jones
- The Little Endless Storybook, a picture book by Jill Thompson

=== Music ===
==== Groups and labels ====
- Story Books, an English band

==== Albums and EPs ====
- Storybook (Kasey Chambers album), 2011
- Storybook (Peter Jöback album), 2004
- A Coloring Storybook and Long-Playing Record, an EP by American band Cinematic Sunrise
- The Adult Storybook, a 2009 album by New Tokyo Terror
- The Supersonic Storybook, a 1991 album by American band Urge Overkill

==== Songs ====
- "Storybook", a song in The Scarlet Pimpernel

=== Television ===
- Cartoon Storybook, a 1959 Canadian children's television series
- Dancing Storybook, a 1959 Canadian children's television series
- HBO Storybook Musicals, a series of television specials
- Storybook International, a British children's television series
- Storybook Squares, a special series of episodes of the NBC game show Hollywood Squares
- The Storybook Series with Hayley Mills, a 1986 American animated television/video series

=== Other arts, entertainment, and media ===
- Storybook Weaver, a 1994 educational game for the Apple Macintosh

== Attractions and parks ==
- Sindbad's Storybook Voyage, a dark ride in boats at Tokyo DisneySea
- Storybook Glen, a children's park in Maryculter, Scotland
- Storybook Land, a family amusement park located in Egg Harbor Township, New Jersey, United States
- Storybook Land Canal Boats, an attraction located at more than one Disneyland theme park
- Storybook Gardens, in Springbank Park

== Education and literacy ==
- African Storybook, a literacy initiative in Africa

== Organizations ==
- Clockwork Storybook, a former writer's collective and independent book publisher based in Austin, Texas
- Storybook Dads, a UK charity which promotes adult literacy

== Other uses ==
- Storybook house, an architectural style popularized in the 1920s in England and United States
- Wanderful Interactive Storybooks, a developer of interactive storybook apps
