= Arthur Knight =

Arthur Knight may refer to:

- Arthur Knight (bishop) (1864–1939), third Bishop of Rangoon
- Arthur Knight (film critic) (1916–1991), movie critic, film historian, professor and TV host
- Arthur Knight (rugby union) (1906–1990), New Zealand rugby union player
- Arthur Knight (footballer) (1887–1956), English Olympic football player and cricketer
- Arthur George Knight (1886–1918), Canadian recipient of the Victoria Cross
- Arthur Gerald Knight (1895–1916), Canadian World War I fighter ace
- Arthur Rex Knight (1903–1963), Australia-born psychologist
- Arthur F. Knight (1865–1936), American inventor credited with invention of steel golf clubs
- Arthur Knight (businessman) (1917–2003), British businessman
- Arthur Knight, an alias of Nicholas Alahverdian (1987–2026), American convicted sex offender who faked his death in 2020
