= JJK (disambiguation) =

JJK may refer to:

- Jujutsu Kaisen, a Japanese manga series by Gege Akutami
  - Jujutsu Kaisen (TV series)
- JJK Jyväskylä, a Finnish football team from the city of Jyväskylä
- John "Julius" Knight, American musician
- Jesper Kyd, Danish video game composer
- Jacqueline "Jackie" Joyner-Kersee, American former heptathlon athlete
- Jeon Jungkook, the lead singer of K-pop group BTS
