= Christopher Knight =

Christopher or Chris Knight may refer to:

== Film and television ==
- Christopher Knight (actor) (born 1957), American actor
- Christopher Knight (filmmaker), blogger and filmmaker
- Chris Knight (Neighbours), fictional character in the soap opera Neighbours, portrayed by Luke Mitchell
- Chris Knight, the protagonist in the motion picture Real Genius

== Music ==
- Chris Knight (singer) (born 1960), American country music singer and songwriter
  - Chris Knight (album), his self-titled debut album

== Writing ==
- Chris Knight (anthropologist), author of several books on human origins and evolutionary linguistics; founding member of the Radical Anthropology Group
- Christopher Knight (author), author of several books examining archaeoastronomy, stone monuments and megaliths, and Freemasonry
- Christopher Knight, the pseudonym used by author Christopher Wright
- Chris W. Knight, author of the autobiography Son of Scarface

== Other uses ==
- Christopher Knight (art critic), American art critic
- Christopher Knight (cricketer) (born 1972), former English cricketer
- Christopher Thomas Knight (born 1965), "North Pond Hermit"
- Chris Knight (rugby union) (born 1991), Welsh rugby player

== See also ==
- Christopher Knights, English voice actor
- Chris Knights (born 1986), Australian football player
