= Margaret Knight =

Margaret Knight is the name of:

- Margaret E. Knight (1838–1914), American inventor
- Margaret K. Knight (1903–1983), British psychologist and humanist
- Margaret Rose Knight (1918–2006), First Lady of North Carolina
