= Jessie Knight =

Jessie Knight may refer to:

- Jessie Knight (tattoo artist)
- Jessie Knight (athlete)
