= Jason Knight =

Jason Knight may refer to:

- Jason Knight (fighter) (born 1992), American featherweight mixed martial artist and bare-knuckle boxer
- Jason Knight (footballer) (born 2001), Irish footballer
- Jason Knight (politician) (born 1969), Rhode Island state representative
- Jason Knight (wrestler) (born 1963), American professional wrestler and manager
- Jason Knight, ABS Master Smith and judges for season 3 of Forged in Fire (TV series)

== See also ==
- Knight (surname)
