= Helen Knight =

British philosopher (1899 – 1984)

(Elsie) Helen Knight (née Weil, 24 November 1899 – 1984) was a British philosopher. She was one of few women active in the early days of analytic aesthetics.

Helen Knight, 1936

== Life and education ==
Knight was born in Swiss Cottage, London and attended Fremarch School, Hampstead. She began her BA at Bedford College, London, before coming to Cambridge University in 1921 where she took Part II Moral Sciences in 1923 and obtained a first class degree. From 1923 to 1925 she was a Research Student at Newnham College. She married psychologist Rex Knight on 30 January 1926 (they divorced in 1936), and then appears to have taken a break from academic philosophy until 1932 when she returned to Newnham as Sarah Smithson Research Fellow. She obtained her PhD in 1935. During the war she was Principal at the Board of Trade, a position that had been temporarily filled by fellow philosopher Margaret MacDonald. She also taught English at an independent girls boarding school, North Foreland Lodge in Kent from 1942 to 1949.

== Career ==
Knight was one of a select group to whom Ludwig Wittgenstein dictated his Blue and Brown Books in the 1930s, which outline the transition in Wittgenstein's thought between his two major works, Tractatus Logico-Philosophicus and Philosophical Investigations.

Knight became a member of the Aristotelian Society in 1922, acting in its executive committee for several terms. Her research area included metaphysics, seen from a Wittgensteinian angle. Between 1935 and 1941 she was a researcher in aesthetics at Cambridge. From 1927 on she published well-received papers on aesthetics for different philosophical journals (Mind, Philosophy and others). In 1945 she addressed the Aristotelian Society, talking about the Women's Graduate Club in Cambridge. "Judging by the calibre of co-presenters, discussants and commentators of her papers, her work was admired and taken seriously.".

In 1949 Knight emigrated to Australia, where she became a tutor in English literature at Janet Clarke Hall, University of Melbourne until the 1960s. She died in Melbourne, Australia aged 84.

== Publications ==
Her work was well received and continues to be included in modern anthologies of aesthetics, as well as in works on metaphysics and epistemology.

- E. Helen Knight (1927). Aesthetic Theories of Mr. Richards. Mind, New Series, 34 (141) 69-76.
- Helen Knight (1928). Philosophy in Germany. Philosophy 6 (23):370 - 376.
- Helen Knight (1930). Aesthetic Experience in Pictorial Art. The Monist 40 (1):74-83.
- Helen Knight (1930). Sense-Form in Pictorial Art. Proceedings of the Aristotelian Society 31:143 - 160.
- Knight, H. (1933). A Note on “The Problem of Universals”. Analysis 1(1), 7–9.
- Reid, L. A., Knight, H., & Joad, C. E. M. (1932). Symposium: The Limits of Psychology in Aesthetics. Proceedings of the Aristotelian Society, Supplementary Volumes, 11, 169–215.
- Helen Knight (1935). The Use of "Good" in Aesthetic Judgments. Proceedings of the Aristotelian Society 36:207 - 222.
- Helen Knight (1936). Stout on Universals. Mind 45 (177):45-60.
