= Tip Williams =

Welsh cricketer

Personal information
- Full name: Lewis Erskine Wyndham Williams
- Born: 28 November 1900; Bonvilston, Cowbridge, Wales
- Died: 24 April 1974 (aged 73); St Hilary, Glamorgan, Wales
- Batting: Right-handed
- Relatives: Robert Knight (father-in-law)

Domestic team information
- Years: Team
- 1928–1930: Glamorgan

Career statistics
Competition	FC
Matches	4
Runs scored	145
Batting average	24.16
100s/50s	–/1
Top score	53*
Balls bowled	42
Wickets	–
Bowling average	–
5 wickets in innings	–
10 wickets in match	–
Best bowling	–
Catches/stumpings	1/–
- Source: Cricinfo, 3 July 2010

Lewis Erskine Wyndham 'Tip' Williams (28 November 1900 – 24 April 1974) was a Welsh cricketer. Williams was a right-handed batsman who bowled right-arm fast-medium. He was born at Bonvilston, Glamorgan. He was educated in his early years at the Oratory School.

Williams made his first-class debut for Glamorgan in 1928 against Oxford University. From 1928 to 1930, he made 4 first-class appearances, with his final first-class appearance for the county coming against Oxford University. In his 4 first-class matches, he scored 145 runs at a batting average of 24.16, with a single half century high score of 53*. In the field he also took a single catch Through his close links to the county club, he was influential in bringing first-class cricket to Cowbridge Cricket Ground.

Williams died at St Hilary, Glamorgan on 24 April 1974.

== Family ==
Williams' father-in-law Robert Knight played first-class cricket for Oxford University from 1878 to 1880.
