= Edward Knight =

Edward Knight is the name of:

- Edward Knight (American actor) (1927–2009), American actor
- Edward Knight (composer) (born 1961), American composer
- Edward Knight (cricketer) (1794–1879), English amateur cricketer
- Edward Knight (English actor) (1774–1826), known as "Little Knight"
- Edward Knight (King's Men) (fl. 1613–1637), English theatrical prompter
- Edward Austen Knight (1768–1852), brother of Jane Austen, and High Sheriff of Kent in 1801
- Edward Frederick Knight (1852–1925), writer and yachtsman
- Edward H. Knight (1824–1883), American mechanical expert
- Edward J. Knight (1864–1908), bishop of the Episcopal Diocese of Western Colorado

== See also ==
- Ted Knight (disambiguation)
