= Francis Knight =

Francis Knight is the name of:

- the author of A Relation of Seven Yeares Slaverie Under the Turkes of Argeire, suffered by an English Captive Merchant, published in 1640 - see 1640s in piracy
- a High Sheriff of Bristol in 1579
- Francis Knight (surgeon) (died 1832), British surgeon and Army medical administrator

== See also ==
- Frank Knight (disambiguation)
