= Frank Knight (disambiguation) =

Frank Knight (1885–1972) was an American economist.

Frank Knight may also refer to:

- Frank Knight (arborist) (1908–2012), American arborist
- Frank Knight (artist) (born 1941), Australian wildlife artist and ornithologist
- Frank Knight (writer) (1905–1998), British author of fiction and non-fiction
- Frank Knight (Canadian football), Canadian football player and coach
- G. A. Frank Knight (1869–1937), Scottish author and Bible scholar

== See also ==
- Francis Knight (disambiguation)
