= Phil Knight (disambiguation) =

Phil Knight (born 1938) is an American businessman and co-founder of Nike, Inc.

Phil Knight, Philip Knight, or Phillip Knight may also refer to:

- Philip Knight (cricketer), (1835–1882), English cricketer
- Phillip Knight (footballer), Australian footballer
- Phil Knight, New Zealand musician in the band Shihad
- Phil Knight, musician in the band the Legendary Pink Dots
