= Maggie Knight =

19th century New Zealand-Australian actor

Margaret "Maggie" Knight (c. 1857 – 20 October 1917) was a New Zealand actress who had a significant career on the Australian stage.

== History ==
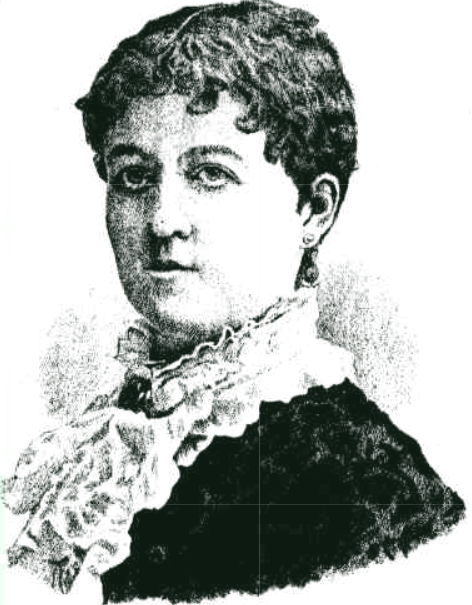
Maggie Knight

Knight was born Margaret Harkness in Auckland, New Zealand around 1857.

She played leading lady to Wybert Reeve in many productions at the Sydney Opera House, in 1883, and also at the Gaiety Theatre. Among her roles were:

- Lady Henry Fairfax, in Diplomacy, based on Sardou's Dora, in 1879.
- Polly Eccles in Robertson's Caste. in 1878 and 1880, when she took her benefit and gave a retirement speech.

Maggie Knight must be one of the most popular members of the dramatic company who are now closing their season at the Theatre Royal, as the house was crammed on Wednesday night . . . We believe it to be as much for Miss Knight's pleasing face and pleasant manners as for her ability as an actress that she is so highly esteemed by the play-going public

She did return however, playing many character parts for the J. C. Williamson organization, also for Bland Holt and George Rignold.

- Nellie Denver in Henry Arthur Jones and Henry Herman's The Silver King in 1885.
- Kate Verity in Pinero's The Squire in 1888
- the old Scotch peasant in Clarke and Meynell's production of Seymour Hicks' The Gay Gordons in 1910.
- supporting Cyril Maude as the Marquise, in a charity production of Robertson's Caste, September 1917.

She died barely a month later.

== Personal ==
Knight married Henry R. Jewett (died 1930) on 2 March 1888 and had a son, Eric. They divorced in 1891 and the following year he left for America, where he had a successful stage and directorial career in Boston. Knight married again in 1893 to Henry William Henderson, general manager of the German-Australian Steamship Company. They had a waterside home at Darling Point.
