= Robert Knight (cricketer, born 1858) =

Welsh cricketer

Personal information
- Full name: Robert Lougher Knight
- Born: 21 April 1858; St Brides Major, Glamorgan, Wales
- Died: 22 May 1938 (aged 80); Tythegston, Glamorgan, Wales
- Batting: Right-handed
- Bowling: Left-arm roundarm medium
- Relatives: Francis Stacey (uncle); Tip Williams (son-in-law)

Domestic team information
- Years: Team
- 1878–1880: Oxford University

Career statistics
Competition	First-class
Matches	8
Runs scored	100
Batting average	8.33
100s/50s	–/–
Top score	36*
Balls bowled	1,241
Wickets	30
Bowling average	14.53
5 wickets in innings	2
10 wickets in match	1
Best bowling	7/39
Catches/stumpings	6/–
- Source: Cricinfo, 9 March 2020

Robert Lougher Knight (21 April 1858 – 22 May 1938) was a Welsh first-class cricketer and barrister.

The son of The Reverend Charles Rumsey Knight, he was born in April 1858 at St Brides Major, Glamorgan. He was educated at Clifton College, matriculating at Corpus Christi College, Oxford in 1877, and graduating B.A. in 1882. While studying at Oxford, he played first-class cricket for Oxford University, making his debut against the Gentlemen of England at Oxford in 1878. He played first-class cricket for Oxford until 1880, making eight appearances. He scored 100 runs in his eight matches, with a high score of 36 not out. With his left-arm roundarm medium bowling, he took 30 wickets at a bowling average of 14.53. He took five wickets in an innings on two occasions and ten wickets in a match once. His best innings figures, 7 for 39, came against the Marylebone Cricket Club in 1878. Knight also played for Oxford University RFC and captained the rugby XV in 1881.

A student of the Inner Temple, he was called to the bar in 1887 and practiced as a barrister. Knight died in May 1938 at Tythegston, Glamorgan. His uncle, Francis Stacey, and son-in-law, Tip Williams, both played first-class cricket.
