= Ted Knight (disambiguation) =

Ted Knight (1923-1986) was an American actor.

Ted Knight is also the name of:

- Starman (Ted Knight), fictional character
- Ted Knight (politician) (1933–2020), left-wing British politician who led Lambeth council in London

== See also ==
- Edward Knight (disambiguation)
- T. R. Knight (born 1973), an American actor
