= Toes in Tempo =

- Genre: Children's television
- Presented by: Shirley Knight (1957); Benjamin Harkarvy (1958)
- Narrated by: Shirley Knight
- Country of origin: Canada
- Original language: English
- No. of seasons: 2
- No. of episodes: 23

Production
- Production location: Winnipeg
- Running time: 30 minutes

Original release
- Network: CBC Television
- Release: 23 April 1957 – 2 July 1958

Toes in Tempo is a Canadian children's dance television program that aired on CBC Television in 1957 and 1958.

== Premise ==
This ballet program for children featured members of the Royal Winnipeg Ballet, particularly its solo dancers Sonja Taverner and Paddy McIntyre. Excerpts from well-known ballet pieces were featured as were demonstrations of ballet techniques.

== Scheduling ==
This half-hour program aired on Tuesdays at 5 p.m.. Its first season of ten episodes aired from 23 April to 25 June 1957 hosted by Shirley Knight. The second season aired 13 episodes on Wednesdays at 5 p.m. from 2 April to 25 June 1958 and was hosted by Benjamin Harkarvy. That season began with an episode featuring a performance of "The Emperor's Clothes".

== See also ==
- Dancing Storybook, a 1959 CBC program featuring the Royal Winnipeg Ballet
