= Charles Wenman (theatre) =

English theatre producer and manager

Charles Alfred Wenman (c. 1876 – 2 October 1954) was an English theatre producer and manager who had a career in Australia as general manager, associate director and producer for J. C. Williamson's.

== History ==
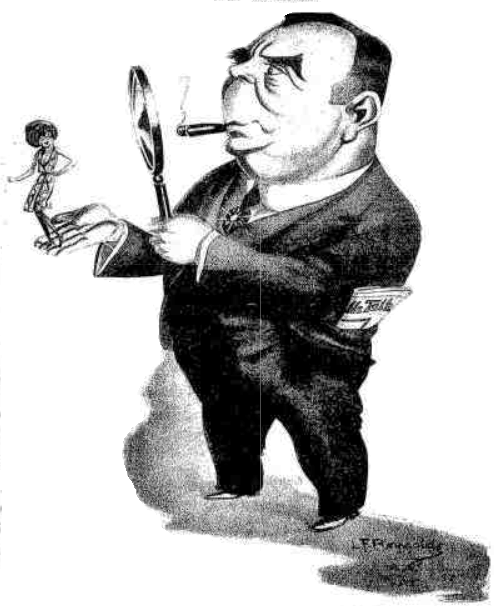
1927 caricature by Reynolds

Wenman was born in England, the second son of T. N. Wenman of London.

His first professional connection with the stage was as a comedian. He was working as producer for the English theatrical firm of Denton, Bode and McKenzie in 1910, when he was appointed by a company whose principals were Sir Rupert Clarke, John Wren, Clive Meynell and John Gunn, later known as Clarke and Meynell, to produce plays for them at the Theatre Royal, in Bourke Street, Melbourne. His first production in Australia was Miss Hook of Holland, followed by a number of musicals, including The Arcadians, The Chocolate Soldier, Tom Jones and The Belle of Mayfair.

Clarke and Meynell merged with J. C. Williamson's in 1911. Clarke became a director and Meynell was made managing director. Wenman was made an associate director, and when Meynell returned to England in 1924, took his place as managing director.

The hugely popular pantomime The Forty Thieves followed in 1914. He scored a similar success with Mother Goose in 1916

He had a long association with Nellie Melba, and was one of the five closest friends to whom she gave a platinum and diamond pin as a memento.

He retired as general manager in 1935, but continued to operate in an advisory capacity until around 1950.

He died at a private hospital in Caloundra, Queensland, and was buried locally.

== Family ==
Wenman married the dancer Ida Florence "Flossie" Dickinson (c. 1890 – 21 November 1953) on 3 January 1914. They had two daughters:

- Patricia "Pat" Wenman (22 October 1914 – ) married Dudley Barr, was later Mrs Stewart
- (Margaret) Sunday Wenman (28 September 1919 – ) married Keith Johns on 3 January 1941

They had a home at 172 Ormond Road Elwood, Victoria.

Henry Wenman (1875–1953), the English actor, was a brother.
