= Madge Knight =

English artist

Madge Knight (1895 in England – 1974 in Bagni di Lucca, Italy) was an English artist. In 1934, Knight married Charles Hougton Howard, a member of the Howard family in California, known for their contributions to the art world. They met during one of his visits to Europe, and he would marry her and move to London, England until the outbreak of the Second World War. Howard and Knight soon became involved in London’s advanced artistic circles, and shortly after his arrival assisted the painter Edward Wadsworth on a mural for the De La Warr Pavilion in Bexhill, England. Knight and Howard participated in English Surrealist movements with Unit One, a group of painters, sculptors, and architects influenced by the principles of Surrealism and Constructivism. This is where Howard’s work was first shown, and Knight began to develop an interest in exploring surreal and dreamlike atmospheres. She lived in London with her husband until 1940, after which they moved to San Francisco for six years, because of the advent of WWII. While in San Francisco she studied and shared ideas with the Howard family and other progressives. Her artwork is considered abstract and she was involved with the surrealist movement while living in San Francisco. After the war she traveled between the US and Europe and shared ideas about modern art in these regions. She died in Bagni di Lucca Italy in 1974. Several of her works are in collections at the San Francisco Museum of Modern Art and the Fine Arts Museums of San Francisco.
