= Joseph Knight =

Joseph Knight may refer to:

- Joseph Knight (cricketer) (1896–1974), English cricketer
- Joseph Knight (critic) (1829–1907), English dramatic critic and theatre historian
- Joseph Knight (horticulturist) (1778–1855), gardener
- Joseph Knight (slave), slave brought from Jamaica to Scotland
  - Joseph Knight (novel), a 2003 historical novel by James Robertson
- Joseph Knight (Royal Navy officer) (c. 1708–1775)
- Joseph Knight Sr. (1772–1847), associate of Joseph Smith, early member of the Latter Day Saint movement
- Joseph Philip Knight (1812–1887), British composer
- Joseph Knight (vegetarian) (c. 1854–1928), English activist and writer
- Joe Knight (baseball) (1859–1938), Major League Baseball left fielder and pitcher
- Joe Knight (boxer) (1909–1976), American boxer
- Joe Knight (politician) (born 1954), American politician
- For the plane crash victim and subject of an internet hoax, see Alaska Airlines Flight 261
