= Ora Willis Knight =

American naturalist (1874–1913)

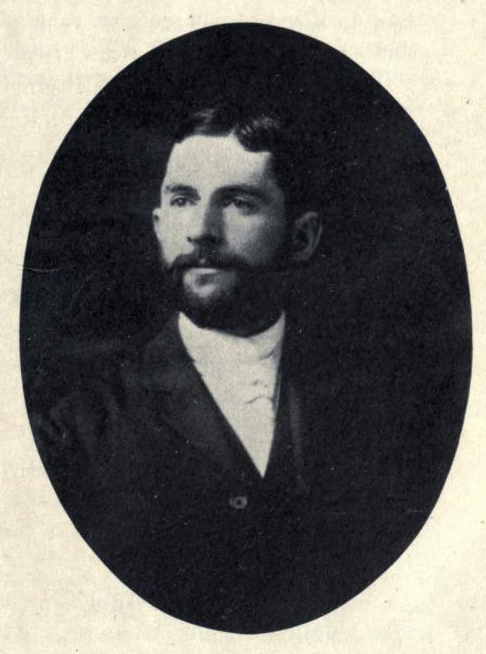

Ora Willis Knight (15 July 1874 – 11 November 1913) was an American naturalist who studied both plants and animals. He served as the state mineralogist for Maine from 1903 until his death.

Knight was born in Bangor, Maine, to George Willis and Nellie Ada (born Blood) Knight. He was educated at Bangor, Maine, and received a BS in 1895 from the Maine State College followed by an MS in 1897. He served as an assistant in natural history at the college and worked briefly as an assistant chemist at the Maine Agricultural Station. He became a state assayer in 1903 and became prominent from his involvement in court cases. He also served as a chemist for Lackawanna Foundries. In 1909 he received a Doctor of Science from the University of Maine and was made a Phi Kappa Phi society member. He worked in Nova Scotia in 1910 locating gold-bearing veins and identifying selenium, tellurium and platinum deposits. Working for Caribou Gold Mines, he also obtained rights to mining claims. He moved to Portland in 1911. He took a keen interest in birds, photography, and botany, giving lectures on bird life. He recorded numerous plant and animal species from the Maine region. In 1908 he reported a fork-tailed flycatcher from Marion, Maine, and noted that taxidermist records were unreliable. In 1908, he published The Birds of Maine. He was elected associate member of the American Ornithologists' Union in 1893 and member in 1907. His herbarium of Maine plants was bequeathed to the Smithsonian Institution. He served as the president of the Josselyn Botanical Society.

He married Minnie Gertrude McDonald in 1899. He died from double pneumonia at Portland, Maine.
