= Amridge University =

Christian university in Montgomery, Alabama, US

- Motto: Where Traditional and Online Education Merge
- Type: Private
- Established: 1967
- Religious affiliation: Churches of Christ
- Endowment: US $174,505
- President: Michael Clark Turner
- Administrative staff: 96
- Undergraduates: 366
- Postgraduates: 346
- Location: Montgomery, Alabama, United States; 32°21′54.1″N 86°10′17.7″W
- Campus: Urban, 9 acres (0.036 km^{2})
- Website: www.amridgeuniversity.edu

Amridge University is a private university affiliated with the Churches of Christ with its main campus in Montgomery, Alabama, United States. It was previously known as Alabama Christian School of Religion, Southern Christian University, and Regions University, and is a successor institution to Alabama Christian College.

Founded in 1967 as the Alabama Christian School of Religion, its primary function historically has been as a theological seminary to train ministers in Bible and Christian Counseling. However, Amridge has expanded its curricula to other degrees. Seminary training offered by the Turner School of Theology, named in honor of founder Rex Allwin Turner Sr. and his wife Opal Shipp Turner, continues to be a core undertaking, with all levels of ministry and theological degrees available.

== History ==
=== Key institutional events ===
- 1942 Montgomery Bible School, founded by Rex Allwin Turner Sr., Calvin Leonard Johnson, and Joseph B. "Joe" Greer, offered both high school and first year college courses, and became a junior college with an elementary and secondary department
- 1949 Expanded curricula to include a third year of Bible and related courses
- 1953 Granted first baccalaureate degrees
- 1954 Institution's name changed to Alabama Christian College
- 1966 Discontinued upper‑level program in religious studies to satisfy accreditation requirements as a junior college
  - High school department became Alabama Christian Academy, a regionally accredited elementary and secondary school
  - Junior college department became what today is Faulkner University
- 1967 Alabama Christian School of Religion founded to assume the upper-level program, offering classes in the new facilities of the College Church of Christ at 5315 Atlanta Highway
- 1972 Expanded curricula to include graduate degree programs
- 1974 Moved to new property jointly purchased with the Landmark Church of Christ at 6020 Atlanta Highway
- 1977 Expanded curricula to include a three‑year graduate program offering the Master of Theology degree
- 1985 Applied for accredited membership in the Southern Association of Colleges and Schools
- 1988 Replaced the Master of Theology degree to conform to standard nomenclature and practice with the Master of Divinity degree, generally recognized as the first professional degree in ministry
- 1987 Sold its interest in the jointly owned property to the Landmark Church of Christ and built its own new campus on 9 acres (36,000 m^{2}) of land on Interstate 85 alongside Auburn University at Montgomery. The School of Religion moved to this new campus at 1200 Taylor Road that summer.
- 1989 Received accreditation by the Southern Association of Colleges and Schools to grant degrees at the bachelor's and master's levels
- 1991 Institution's name changed to Southern Christian University to reflect the widened geographical area served by the institution and emphasized the academic level and the emerging direction of the institution
- 1992 Expanded curricula by adding the Doctor of Ministry (D.Min.) degree and the distance-learning program
- 1994 Reaffirmation by the Southern Association of Colleges and Schools including the two aforementioned substantive changes
- 1994 Changes in Alabama state licensure law in Family Therapy grandfathered the institution to permit reconfiguration of its counseling program
- 1999 Selected by the US Department of Education to help pilot the Distance Education Demonstration Program
- 2002 Purchased 185 acres (0.75 km^{2}) of land alongside Interstate 85, located 15 miles (24 km) from the main campus to accommodate future growth
- 2003 Southern Association of Colleges and Schools approved Doctor of Philosophy (Ph.D.) in Family Therapy degree program
- 2005 Decadal reaffirmation by the Southern Association of Colleges and Schools including the following substantive changes in its curricula
  - Bachelor of Science in Business Administration – General Business
  - Bachelor of Science in Business Administration – Information Communication
  - Bachelor of Science in Business Administration – Information Systems Management
  - Doctor of Philosophy in Biblical Studies degree
- 2006 Southern Association of Colleges and Schools approved Associate of Arts degree program
- 2006 Institution's name changed to Regions University
- 2008 Institution's name changed to Amridge University

=== 2006-2008 name changes ===
On August 2, 2006, Southern Christian University's board of regents voted to change the institution's name to Regions University. They expected this would enhance the institution's opportunities, complementing its purpose and vision while expanding its scope of educational and religious heritage to all the regions of the world. The name change, however, sparked a civil lawsuit by Regions Financial Corporation filed on September 29, 2006, for trademark infringement. Consequently, on January 31, 2008, the board of regents resolved to change the institution's name again, this time to Amridge University, preserving its mission and vision to expand its operations worldwide.

=== Presidents ===
- Rex Allwin Turner Sr., Ed.D. 1967 – 1983
- Rex Allwin Turner Jr., Ed.D. 1983 – August 2008
- Stanley Douglas Paterson, Ed.D. (interim) August 2008 - March 2009
- Michael Clark Turner, D.O. March 2009 – present

== Academics ==
In keeping with its Christian heritage, Amridge University provides educational opportunities through five schools: the College of Business and Leadership, the College of General Studies, the School of Education and Human Services, the Turner School of Theology, and the School of Continuing Education. It is accredited by the Southern Association of Colleges and Schools. Additionally, it is approved by the Alabama Department of Postsecondary Education and the Tennessee Higher Education Commission.

== Facilities ==
The institution's main campus in Montgomery, Alabama lies alongside Auburn University Montgomery just north of Interstate 85 at the Taylor Road exit. The campus consists of a single two-story complex, the Morgan W. Brown Building, that houses classrooms and the library on the ground floor and administrative offices upstairs. Classrooms are equipped with extensive multimedia equipment to allow live Internet streaming of instruction and lecture. Instructors can also transmit computer data, video, or still pictures. Each student's desk has a computer workstation.

The Amridge University library features a large collection of religious books and theological reference works. It holds 80,000 titles, 1,200 serial subscriptions, and 800 audiovisual materials.
