= Llandough, Llanfair =

Coordinates: 51.45°N 3.45°W

Llandough: Welsh: Llandochau
- Hamlet
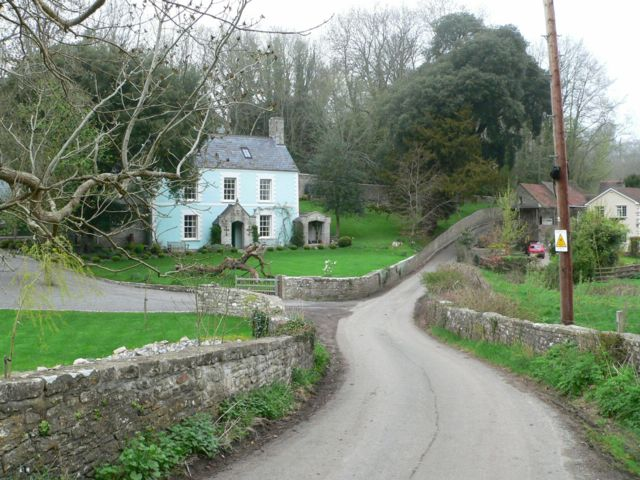

- Location within the Vale of Glamorgan
- OS grid reference: SS995729
  - Cardiff: 15 miles
- Community: Llanfair
- Principal area: Vale of Glamorgan
- Preserved county: South Glamorgan
- Country: Wales
- Sovereign state: United Kingdom
- Post town: COWBRIDGE
- Postcode district: CF71
- Police: South Wales
- Fire: South Wales
- Ambulance: Welsh
- UK Parliament: Vale of Glamorgan
- Senedd Cymru – Welsh Parliament: Vale of Glamorgan

Llandough (Welsh: Llandochau) is a village in the community of Llanfair, south of Cowbridge in the Vale of Glamorgan, Wales.

== Notable landmarks ==
The following are Grade listed buildings:

- Church of St. Dochdwy (II)
- Llandough Castle (II*)
- Llandough Castle Flats (II) (SAM)
- Llandough Gatehouse and attached boundary walls (II*)
- Northeast, Southeast, and Southwest walls, gatepiers and railings enclosing Llandough Castle and Gatehouse (II) (SAM)
- Village Hall (II)
- The Rectory (II)
