= Charles H. Knight =

American Civil War soldier (1839–1904)

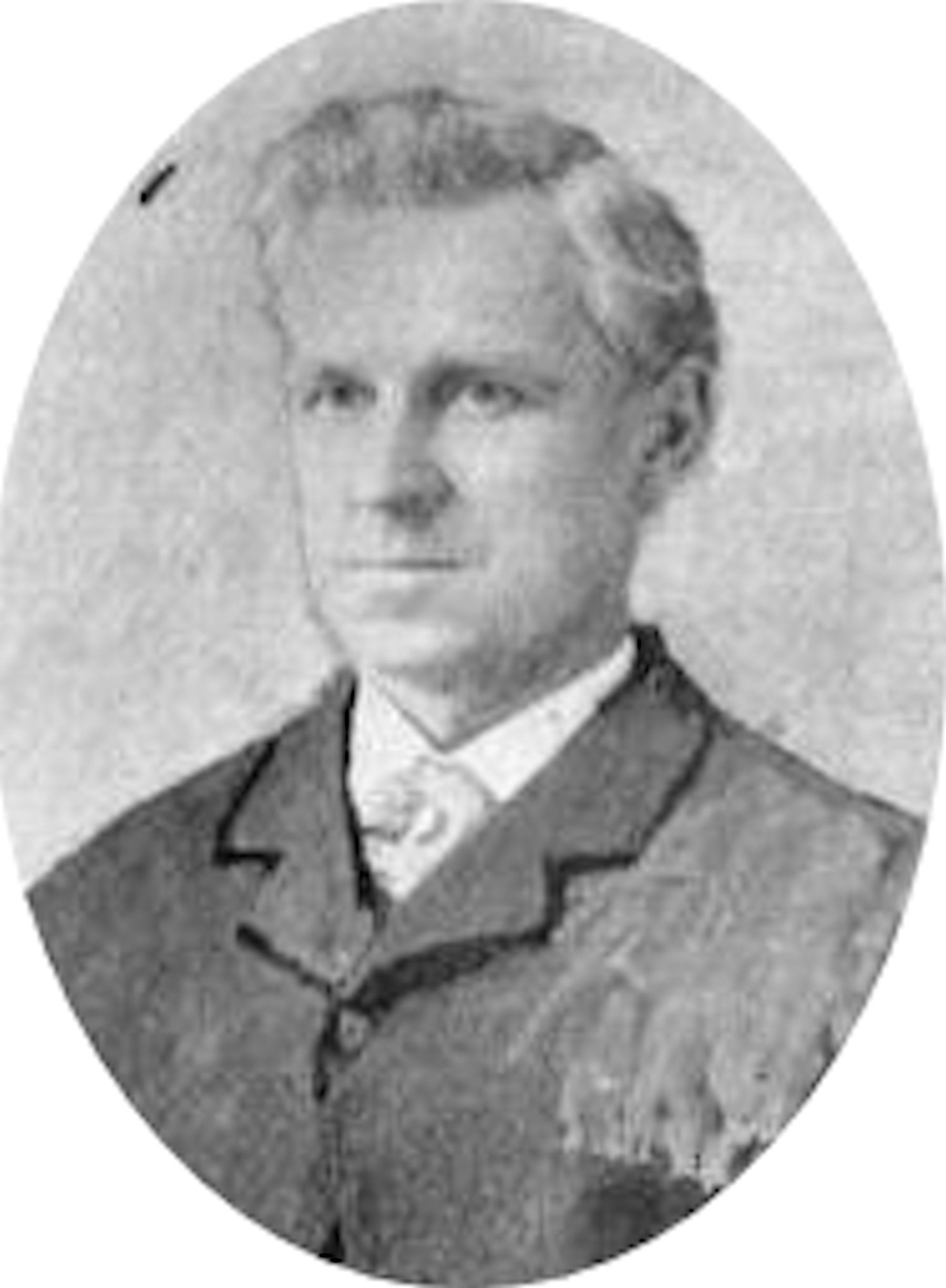
Charles H. Knight c1875. Photograph is in the public domain.

Charles H. Knight (1839 - August 9, 1904) was an American soldier and recipient of the Medal of Honor who received the award for his actions in the American Civil War.

== Biography ==
Knight was born in Keene, Cheshire County, New Hampshire in 1839. He served as a corporal with Company I of the 9th New Hampshire Volunteer Infantry Regiment in the Union Army. He earned his medal in action at Petersburg, Virginia on July 30, 1864. His medal was issued on July 27, 1896. He died on August 9, 1904, in West Springfield, Massachusetts and is now buried in Oak Grove Cemetery, Springfield, Massachusetts.

== Medal of Honor Citation ==
For extraordinary heroism on 30 July 1864, in action at Petersburg, Virginia. In company with a sergeant, Corporal Knight was the first to enter the exploded mine; was wounded but took several prisoners to the Federal lines.
