= John R. Knight =

American pediatrician

- Education: Boston University College of Liberal Arts; University of Vermont School of Medicine
- Occupation: Pediatrician
- Website: http://www.childrenshospital.org/ceasar/

John R. Knight is an Associate Professor of Pediatrics at Harvard Medical School (HMS) and the Associate Director for Medical Education at the HMS Division on Addictions. In 1999, he founded the Center for Adolescent Substance Abuse Research (CeASAR) and its companion outpatient clinic, the Adolescent Substance Abuse Program (ASAP). CeASAR and ASAP were the first programs of their kind to be located at a children’s hospital. He is best known as the clinical scientist who developed and validated the CRAFFT substance abuse screen for adolescents. In 2008 he was named the inaugural incumbent of the Boston Children’s Hospital Endowed Chair in Developmental Medicine

== The CRAFFT Screening Test ==
Knight and his colleagues first assessed other brief substance abuse screening tests.^{1-3} They then developed a new brief screener known as “CRAFFT” that was shown to be valid, reliable, developmentally appropriate for adolescents, and practical for use in busy pediatric offices.^{4,5} CRAFFT has since become the American Academy of Pediatrics’ recommended standard of care in its policy statements, and it is recommended in their Bright Futures health supervision visit as the alcohol and drug-use assessment.

== Research ==
- Validity of brief alcohol screening tests among adolescents: a comparison of the AUDIT, POSIT, CAGE, and CRAFFT
- Nonmedical use of prescription opioids among U.S. college students: Prevalence and correlates from a national survey
- Non‐medical use of prescription stimulants among US college students: Prevalence and correlates from a national survey
- Alcohol abuse and dependence among U.S. college students.

Dr. Knight in Other Media

- Interview with Drug-Free Kids
- Q&A with Dr. Knight
- 7 Ways to Protect Your Teen from Alcohol and Other Drugs
- Presentation: Dazed and Confused: Medical Marijuana and the Developing Adolescent Brain
- Medical Marijuana Use For Children With Developmental Disorders May Do More Harm Than Good
- Youth Substance Abuse Still a Serious Problem

Knight has contributed to the following textbooks

- Developmental Behavioral Pediatrics, 3rd Edition
- Principles of Addiction Medicine, 5th Edition
- The Soul of Medicine
- Comprehensive Adolescent Health Care

Dr. Knight's Work has been cited in the following textbooks

- Guidelines for Perinatal Care (Forthcoming – Lormand)
- Updates in Adolescent Medicine (Forthcoming – Voss)
