= Clarke and Meynell =

Australian theatrical production company

Clarke and Meynell was a theatrical production company in Australia.

== History ==
Clyde Harold van Straubenzee, (1869–1934), son of Lt-Colonel Frederick van Straubenzee, trained as a doctor, but abandoned medicine for the stage, as Clyde Meynell actor, and (later) theatrical manager.

Meynell and John Gunn (c. 1869–1909) founded Strand Comedy Company 1905, leased the Criterion Theatre, Sydney. Gunn was a nephew of Michael Gunn and cousin of George Edwardes.

Became Clarke, Meynell and Gunn with addition of Sir Rupert Clarke and (briefly) John Wren in March 1908. In 1909 they secured rights to The Arcadians, and formed a comic opera company in England to play it, hiring Charles Wenman as producer.

In 1911 the company merged with J. C. Williamson's of which Clarke became a director and Meynell was made Managing Director. Returned to England 1924 and resumed his medical practice, but was not successful.
