= Mark Knight =

Mark Knight may refer to:

- Mark Knight (cartoonist), Australian cartoonist
- Mark Knight (musician), British musician, video-game music composer and sound designer
- Mark Knight (DJ), British disc jockey and house music producer

== See also ==
- Marcus Knight, American college football player and coach
- Marcus Knight (priest), Anglican priest
