= William Angus Knight =

Scottish minister, author, educator (1836–1916)

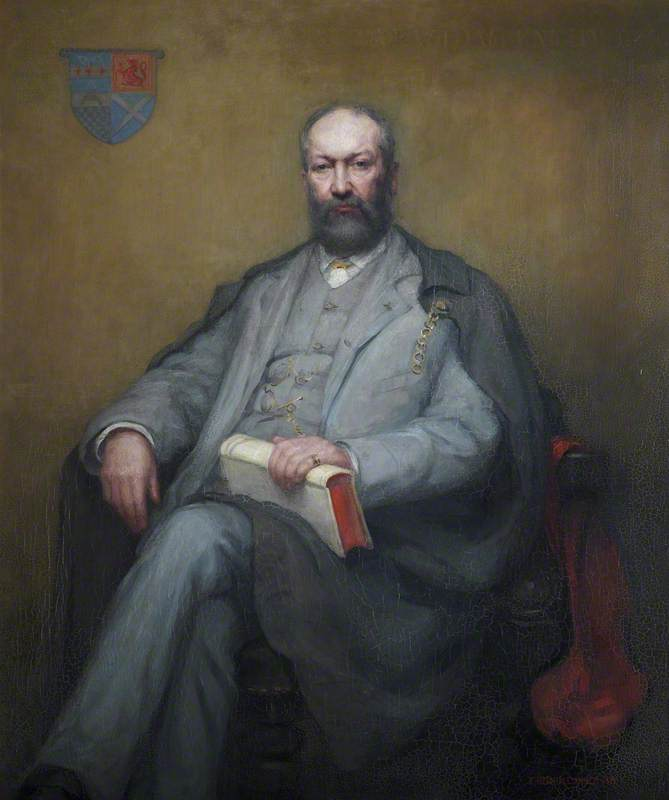
- Born: 22 February 1836; Mordington, Scottish Borders, Scotland
- Died: 4 March 1916 (aged 80); Keswick, Cumbria, England
- Occupations: Minister; author; educator

William Angus Knight (22 February 1836 – 4 March 1916) was a Scottish Free Church minister and author and Professor of Moral Philosophy at St Andrews University. He created the Lady Literate in Arts qualification.

== Life ==
He was born in the manse at Mordington in the Scottish Borders on 22 February 1836, the son of Rev George Fulton Knight.

He was educated locally and at the high school in Edinburgh, then studied at the University of Edinburgh for a general degree before training as a Free Church minister at New College, Edinburgh. He was ordained at St Enoch's Free Church in Dundee in 1866. In 1873, in quite a rare move, he and his congregation left the Free Church and joined the Church of Scotland.

In 1876 he was made Professor of Moral Philosophy in the University of St. Andrews. In a state of constant change he left the Church of Scotland in 1879 to join the Scottish Episcopal Church. He retired in 1902 and died on 4 March 1916 in Keswick.

In the field of philosophy his work, editorial and other, includes his collection of Philosophical Classics for English Readers (15 volumes, 1880–90), some of which he wrote. Although he wrote numerous publications, he is probably best known for his works on Wordsworth. His edition of Wordsworth's Works and Life (1881–89) is contained in 11 volumes. He presented to the trustees of Dove Cottage, Grasmere, the poet's former home, all the editions of Wordsworth's poems which he possessed. He also corresponded with Robert Browning about Elizabeth Barrett Browning, and on his retirement in 1905 he came to Florence's Swiss-owned so-called English Cemetery to plant the red rose at her tomb, which still flourishes, to honour women's learning, though the enamelled plaque celebrating that act has since been stolen.

== Artistic recognition ==
His portrait by Elizabeth Alexander was presented to St Andrews University by the Ladies Literate in Arts whose admission he encouraged.

== Works ==
- Hume (1886)
- Principal Shairp and his Friends (1888)
- Essays in Philosophy, Old and New (1890)
- The Philosophy of the Beautiful (two volumes, 1891–93)
- The Christian Ethic (1894)
- Aspects of Theism (1894)
- The Transactions of the Wordsworth Society (1880–86)
- Selections from Wordsworth (1889)
- Wordsworthiana (1889)
- Through the Wordsworth Country (1892)
- Wordsworth's Prose (1893)
- The English Lake District, as Interpreted in the Poems of Wordsworth (1878–91)
- The Poetical Works of William Wordsworth (1896)
- The Works of William Wordsworth and Dorothy Wordsworth (twelve volumes, 1896–97)
- Dove Cottage from 1800 to 1900 (1900)
- Lord Monboddo and Some of his Contemporaries (1900)
- Inter Amicos (1901)
- Pro Patria et Regina (1901)
- Varia: Studies on Problems of Philosophy and Ethics (1901)
- Retrospects (1903)
- The Poets on Christmas (1906)
- Things New and Old (1909)
- The Golden Wisdom of the Apocrypha (1910)
- The Glamour of University of Oxford (1911)
- The Browning Centenary (1912)
- An Eastern Anthology (1912)
- Coleridge and Wordsworth in the West Country: Their Friendship, Work, and Surroundings (1914)

== Family ==
In 1865 he married Mary Simpson Landale.

His nephew was Rev G. A. Frank Knight.
