= Jonathan Knight (disambiguation) =

Jonathan Knight (born 1968) is an American singer.

Jonathan Knight may also refer to:

- Jonathan Knight (physician) (1789–1864), American physician
- Jonathan Knight (railroader) (1787–1858), U.S. congressman and civil engineer
- Jonathan C. Knight (born 1964), British physicist

== See also ==
- John Knight (disambiguation)
