= John Knight (Alabama politician) =

Alabama politician

Member of the Alabama House of Representatives from the 77th district
- In office 1993–2018
- Succeeded by: Tashina Morris

Personal details
- Born: June 7, 1945 (age 81) Montgomery, Alabama, U.S.
- Party: Democratic

John F. Knight, Jr. (born June 7, 1945) is an American politician who served as a member of the Alabama House of Representatives from 1993 to 2018. He is a member of the Democratic party.

Knight was also member of the House Health Committee, the Internal Affairs Committee, and was chairman of the House Ways and Means General Fund Committee. He has been an advocate for the funding of minority higher education in Alabama, and is the named plaintiff of Knight v. Alabama.
