= Arthur Rex Knight =

Arthur Rex Knight (9 May 1903 – 12 March 1963), known as Rex Knight, was born in Wilcannia, New South Wales in Australia. He later emigrated to the United Kingdom and became a psychologist.

== Career and education ==
Knight graduated in philosophy with First Class honours from the University of Sydney in 1923, and in 1925 he also took a First in Moral Sciences at the University of Cambridge. He worked at the National Institute of Industrial Psychology during 1925–28, first as an investigator, then as assistant to the director, C.S. Myers, and co-editor of the institute's journal. He then spent a year as lecturer in Philosophy and Psychology at the University of St. Andrews, working with Alec Mace. At the University of Aberdeen he was first lecturer, and later reader in psychology. In 1929 he succeeded James L. McIntyre as Anderson Lecturer in Psychology at the University of Aberdeen and was, he commented, "probably the only person north of Dundee in a post in psychology". On the establishment of a chair in the subject, in 1947, Knight became the first Anderson Professor of Psychology. He was President of the British Psychological Society in 1953–54.

During World War II he gave a weekly broadcast commentary for the Ministry of Information. He was also attached to the War Office staff of the Directorate for Selection of Personnel.

His book on Intelligence and Intelligence Tests and a textbook A Modern Introduction to Psychology, written with his wife, Margaret became widely used.

== Personal life ==
Knight married philosopher Elsie (Helen) Weill on 30 January 1926. They divorced in 1936. He then married his second wife, Margaret Horsey, a fellow psychologist in 1936, and the couple collaborated in writing A Modern Introduction to Psychology, which was first published in 1948 and passed through many editions. He was renowned by his students as an excellent and passionate lecturer. He died of a heart attack on 12 March 1963 aged 59.
