= Alan Knight (professor of journalism) =

Australian academic

Alan David Knight (born 1949, Brisbane, Australia; died 20 February 2017, Sydney, Australia) was an adjunct Professor at Griffith University, Honorary Research Fellow at the Centre of Asia Studies at Hong Kong University, a visiting professor at the University of Hong Kong and emeritus professor at Central Queensland University. He was Head of the Graduate School of Journalism at University of Technology, Sydney and Head of journalism at the Queensland University of Technology from 2005 to 2009.

== Academic career ==
Doctorate of Philosophy (1998), University of Wollongong. Thesis: Reporting South East Asia: Australian Foreign Correspondents. Bachelor of Arts (1974), University of Queensland.

Knight started his academic career in 1990 as lecturer in journalism at the University of Technology, Sydney (1990–1992), and was subsequently appointed Director of the Australian Centre for Independent Journalism in 1992. He was later appointed a board member of the ACIJ in 2004.

Knight was the foundation Chair of Journalism and Media Studies at the Central Queensland University (1998–2006), and served as the university's president of the Academic Board, and a member of the Council and Senior Executive (2000–2005). In 2006 Knight was appointed as an emeritus professor at Central Queensland University.

In 2006 Knight was appointed the Chair Journalism Media and Communication at the Creative Industries Faculty, Queensland University of Technology.

Knight served as the Australian representative and board member of the Asian Media Information and Communication Centre (AMIC) and was subsequently appointed as an Honorary Research Fellow at the Centre of Asia Studies at Hong Kong University. He was also a visiting professor at Hong Kong University.

Knight continued to play an active role in Australian radio journalism, and was national spokesperson for Friends of the ABC in 2007. He was a founding Director of Brisbane Community Radio station, 4ZZZ in 1975.

== Journalism career ==
Before becoming an academic, Dr Knight was a reporter, a ministerial public relations staffer, and an Executive Producer responsible for budgeted program production, casual employees and staff supervision. He began his journalism career in 1973 as Brisbane correspondent for the Nation Review, before working for Queensland Newspapers, AAP, and the ABC and in 1997, Radio Television Hong Kong.

== Bibliography ==
=== Books ===
- Reporting Hong Kong: The Foreign press and the handover. Curzon Press/St Martins Press London/New York (Co-author: Yoshiko Nakano) 1999

=== Selected Refereed Journal Article and Chapters ===
- "Who is a journalist?" Journalism Studies. Volume 9 Number 1. Routledge. London. pp 117/114. 2008
- "The Taking of the ABC" Australian Options Number 51. Adelaide. pp13/16. 200
- "Jihad and the Media: Osama bin Laden as reported in the Asian Pacific press." Pacific Journalism Review. Auckland. NZ. Vol.13.No.2 pp155/174 2007.
- "Radical Media in the Deep North: The Origins of 4ZZZ Radio" Queensland Review. Brisbane. Vol. 14, No. 1. pp 95 – 105. 2007
- "Capturing Digital Natives; The News Corporation Agenda" eJournalist, Volume 6, (1). ( https://web.archive.org/web/20070829051039/http://ejournalism.au.com/ejournalist_v6n1.htm ) 2006.
- "The 'political gorilla' and the Pacific Forum" Pacific Journalism Review. Auckland, NZ. Volume 11 (2) pp 170/190. 2005
- "Covering the Boxing Day Tsunami: the media mandate." Australian Studies in Journalism. University of Queensland. Brisbane. Number 15. pp 56/ 91 2005
- Knight, A. Abusalem, A. "Educating Journalists in a globalised world" eJournalist. Volume 5(1). (https://web.archive.org/web/20070829050949/http://ejournalism.au.com/ejournalist_v5n1.htm )
- "Ratbags, revolutionaries and free speech; the radical press in Queensland in 1968. Pacific Journalism Review, Vol 10 (1), Auckland 2004, pp 153/170
- Knight, A., Ubayasiri, K. "Terrorism of the world wide web" Gulf Media Review Online. Zayed University.( https://web.archive.org/web/20050404185828/http://www.zu.ac.ae/cmtr/gmr/ ) 2003.
- Chengju Huang, Chris Lawe Davies, and Alan Knight "Beyond Party Propaganda: A case study of China’s rising commercialised press, eJournalist, CQU, Rockhampton https://web.archive.org/web/20081120153231/http://www.ejournalism.au.com/ejournalist/v1n2.html, 2003
- "Australian based foreign correspondents and their sources" eJournalist. Volume 1 (1) (https://web.archive.org/web/20070829051238/http://ejournalism.au.com/ejournalist_v1n1.htm ) 2001
- "Investigative Journalism on the Internet". Australian Journalism Review. Vol 22 (2), Sydney. 2000 pp 48/58
- "Covering the Global Village" Media Asia. AMIC. Singapore. Vol 25 ( 2) pp 71/77. * "Fact or Friction? The collision of journalism values in Asia" Australian Journalism Review 1998 pp166/185
- "Hong Kong: the future begins" IPI Report, (Los Angeles: International Press Institute1997) 8/13.
- "Reinventing the Killing Fields: Press coverage of Cambodia", in Austral-Asian Image Cultures, ed. M. Dever (London: Curzon Press/University of Hawaii Press, 1997).
- "Dispatches: Australian Foreign Correspondents in their cultural and historical context". Arena, October/November 1995. 42–44.
- "Thai press freedoms a challenge a region" Reportage, Summer 1995 : 31/33.
- "Re-inventing the wheel: Sources used by Australian Foreign Correspondents in Southeast Asia". Media Asia. Asian Mass Communications and Research Centre. Singapore. Volume 22 (1), 1995. 9/17.
- "Closed circle covers the Asia round", Reportage, Summer 1994: 19–22.
- "Mis-reporting Cambodia", Australian Journalism Review November 1994. Queensland University of Technology. Brisbane. 17/44.
- "De-regulating Australian Broadcasting", On the Record Hong Kong Journalists' Union, Volume Two Number One, Hong Kong. 16/18
- "Kill One, Warn 100: State secrecy and reporting on China.", Reportage, Winter 1994: 38–39.
- "ABC in Orbit: Australia Television International's conflicts of interests", Arena, May/June 1994: 5–7.
- "Exporting Exploitation: Foreign investment in the Pearl River Delta", Arena, December/January 1993: 21–23.
- "Election week in Cambodia", Arena, August/September 1993:24–25. 1991 * "An Inconvenient Victim", Travesty! Miscarriages of Justice, ed. K. Carrington et al., Sydney: Pluto Press, 1991:162-70.
