= Steve Knight =

Steve, Steven, or Stephen Knight may refer to:

- Steve Knight (musician) (1935–2013), American jazz/rock keyboard
- Steve Knight (politician) (born 1966), former U.S. Representative from California
- Steve Knight (pool player) (1973–2019), British pool player
- Steven Knight (born 1959), British writer and co-creator of Who Wants to Be a Millionaire?
- Steven Knight (footballer) (1961–2009), Australian rules footballer
- Stephen Knight (author) (1951–1985), British author
- Stephen Knight (martyr) (died 1555), English Protestant martyr
- Stephen Knight (poet) (born 1960), Welsh writer
- Stephen Knight (politician), former Member of the London Assembly (2012-2016)
- Stephen Knight (rugby) (born 1948), former representative Australian rugby league and rugby union footballer
- Stephen Thomas Knight (born 1940), British academic
