= Nick Knight =

Nick Knight or Nicholas Night may refer to:

== People ==
- Nick Knight (cricketer) (born 1969), former England international cricketer
- Nick Knight (photographer) (born 1958), British fashion photographer, documentary photographer, and web publisher
- Nick Knight (professor), professor of Asian studies
- Nick Knight (born 1959), stage name of American pornographic actor Mickey G.
- Nicholas Egbert Knight (1866–1946), South Dakota politician

== Other ==
- Nick Knight (film), a television movie released in 1989
- Nick Knight (Forever Knight), a fictional character in the TV series Forever Knight
- Nick & Knight, a 2014 eponymous album by American singing duo Nick Carter and Jordan Knight

== See also ==
- Nick at Nite
