= John Knight (soap maker) =

British Industrialist

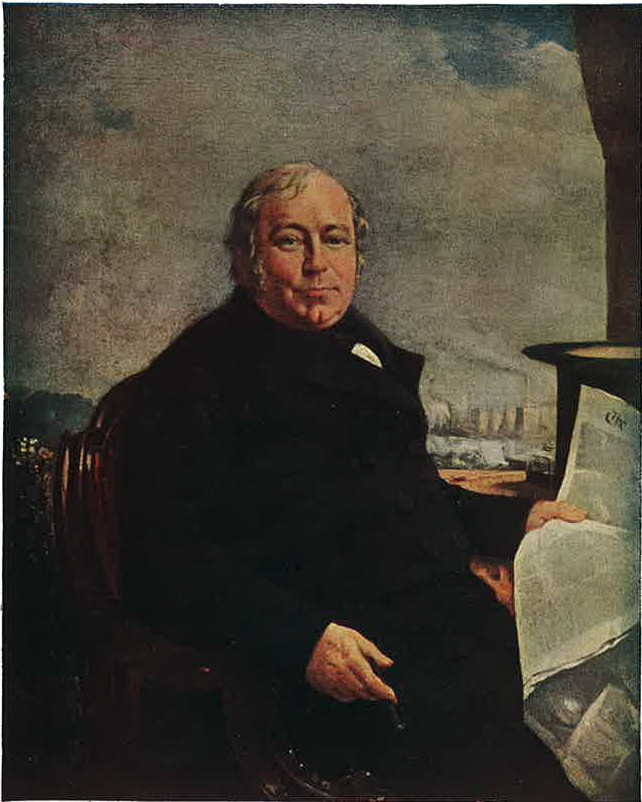
- Painting of John Knight c. 1840
- Born: 25 December 1792; Hertfordshire, England
- Died: 6 April 1864 (aged 71); Chigwell, Essex, England
- Citizenship: British
- Occupations: Candle and soap manufacturer
- Years active: 1810–1851
- Employer: Founder of John Knight's Soap Works in London
- Successor: William Knight (son)
- Spouse: Phoebe Ann Fitchett (m. 1817)
- Children: William Knight (1818–1910); +6 others

John Knight (25 December 1792 – 6 April 1864) was an English businessman and founder of John Knight Soap Works in London, which later became The Royal Primrose Soap Works.

In 1810, John Knight started making candles and soaps, in his spare time, using scraps of material from his job working for a grocer in London. The son of a farmer, Knight was about 18 years old when he established a company in London that would last for 200 years.

== Early life ==
John Knight was born on Christmas Day in 1792 (Note: John Knight was born 25 December 1792 according to two versions of the hand-written Quaker birth certificate. However, Knight's grave marker shows the year as 1793, which is the date used on Find A Grave.) to a large Quaker family of farmers in Hertfordshire, England. He left home at the age of 15, with only the money in his pocket, and set off to try and make his fortune in London. First, he served as an indentured apprentice in a grocer's shop in the Mile End, East London. There, Knight learned the art of tallow candle dipping.

== Career ==
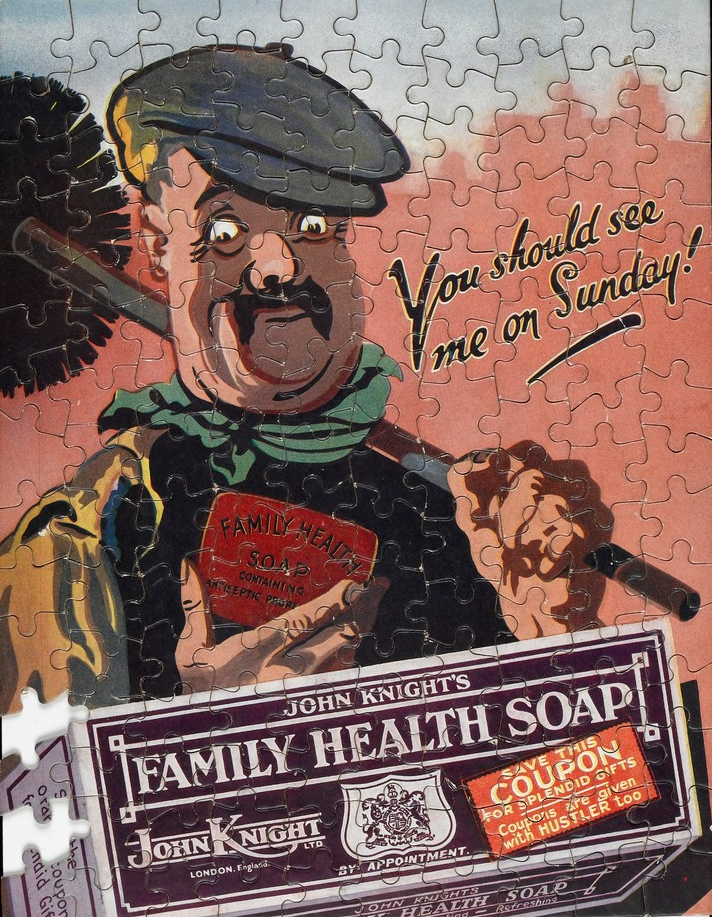
Jigsaw for John Knight's "Family Health Soap"

Knight saw an untapped demand for soap while working in the working-class neighborhood of Wapping in East London. His goal was to make affordable products that would work well and that everyone would enjoy using.

In 1817, John Knight Soap Works was officially established in the industrial area of Wapping, East London. The company was renamed John Knight & Sons when five sons joined the business in the 1840s. For decades, Knight provided candles and washing soaps to the royal family in London. In recognition, John Knight & Sons were awarded a Royal Warrant that officially branded the company as Soap Makers to King Edward VII, in 1903. It was also during this year that the name of Primrose Soap was changed to The Royal Primrose Soap. In 1906, the soap and candle company went public as John Knight, Ltd.

The first of John Knight's factories was based next to the London Docks by the River Thames. This was a busy industrial area of town. The company hired and trained hundreds of local workers for the factory in East London. The business became known for producing high-quality Primrose Soap, Castile soap, and "John Knight's Family Health Soap" to promote public health. John Knight's soaps, oils and candles were used in hospitals and by families throughout England.

=== Primrose Soap ===
The soap of those early days was dark in color, and the consumption small; Knight revolutionized the trade by manufacturing a high-quality pale yellow soap, which he named "Primrose Soap".

=== Family business ===
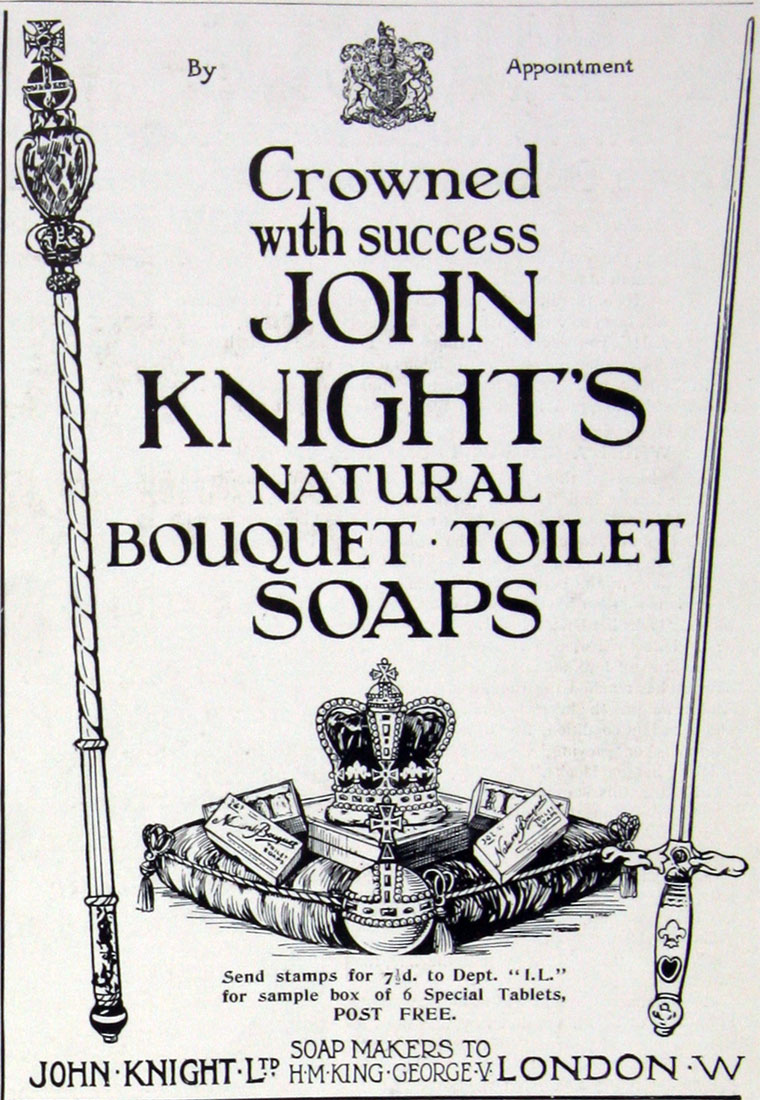
John Knight Ltd, Soap Makers to King George V

Knight was one of the first companies in London to hire women to work in factories during World War I. They supported reducing factory shifts from 12 hours down to a reasonable 8 hours. This strategy increased the number of workers hired and improved productivity.

The company was one of the first in London to provide an annual bonus and a pension for retired workers. They supported local schools and provided recreational opportunities for employees who worked in the factory for decades.

== John Knight & Sons ==
Over the years, John Knight ramped up his manufacturing business since the products were in high demand throughout England, Australia and America. As the business grew, his five sons joined him to run the company. In 1871, William Knight (John's first son) was head of the company – with 300 employees. Soap manufacturer Charles Upfold served his apprenticeship as a soap maker with John Knight & Co. at their Wapping factory in London.

In 1851, after obtaining the Prize Medal at the first Great Exhibition in Hyde Park Mr. Knight retired from the business, which he left in the hands of his five sons, by whom it had been carried on with increased energy and success under the style of John Knight & Sons

— Wyman And Sons, Wyman's Commercial Encyclopedia Of Leading Manufacturers Of Great Britain, And Their Productions: Being A Guide To Merchant Buyers (1888)

John Knight's company was officially sanctioned as "Soap Makers to the King". The factory became known as The Royal Primrose Soap Works in Silvertown.

== Business in England ==
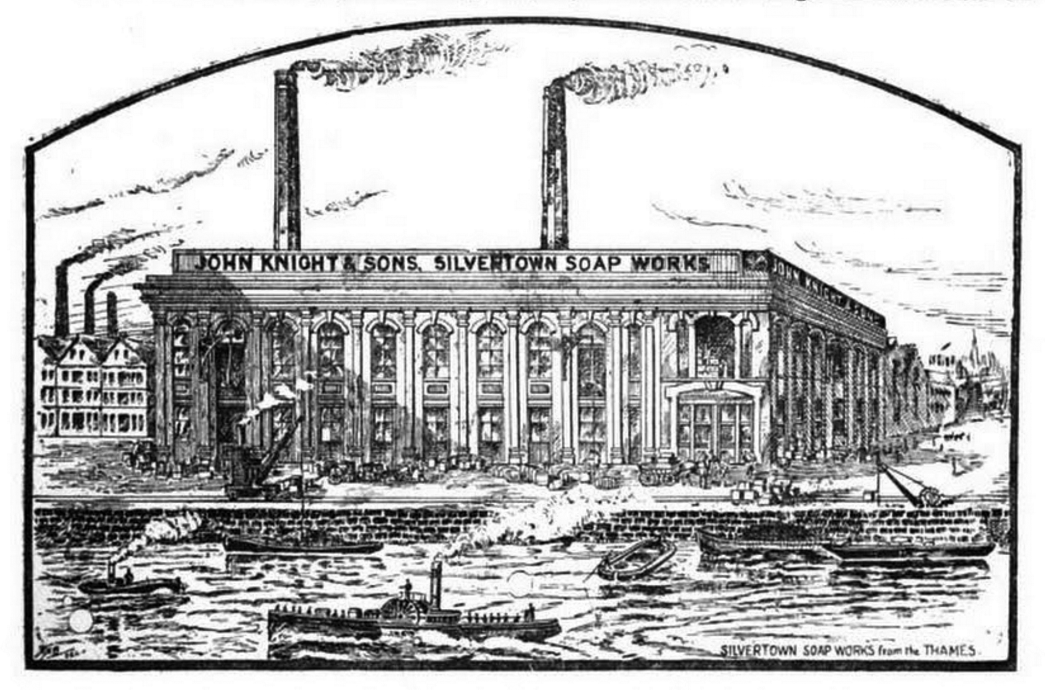
John Knight & Sons – Silvertown Soap Works

The candle, oils and soap business was established in 1817 in Radcliff Way, and when the business expanded they moved to larger premises at Old Gravel Lane, Wapping, in 1836. The large factory was located near the London Docks in Wapping, East London. The location near the River Thames allowed for the supply of raw materials and easy distribution of products by river or road. The company expanded the product line to include oils, glue, shaving soap, perfume and other items.

In 1891, the company was listed in the London Directory.

Knight's Carbolic Soap was produced around 1890 – before Lifebuoy soap was developed in 1895. Later, the company reformulated the carbolic soap, previously made from coal tar, and branded it as Family Health Soap.

The affordable soaps produced by John Knight & Sons helped to prevent disease and keep citizens healthy. The soap company promoted hand washing via print publications and postcards. Their public messaging of cleanliness was especially important during wars and disease epidemics. The anti-bacterial soap was distributed to soldiers and POWs during the wars.

By 1922, the company was an associate of Lever Brothers. By 1959, it was employing 1,200 people in Factory Road making soap, glue, tallow, fertilisers, vegetable and dripping. It was now a subsidiary of the massive Unilever organisation. But in Silvertown, we had to live with the smell.

— Colin Grainger, Journalist and historian
