= Jack Knight =

Jack Knight may refer to:

- Jack Knight (actor) (1938–2025), American actor
- Jack Knight (aviator), delivered first overnight transcontinental airmail
- Jack Knight (baseball) (1895–1976), American right-handed pitcher in Major League Baseball
- Jack Knight (footballer) (1912–1976), Australian rules footballer
- Jack Knight (political scientist) (born 1952), American political scientist
- Jack Knight (songwriter), American songwriter and producer
- Jack Knight (unionist) (1902–1981), American labor union leader
- Jack L. Knight (1917–1945), American soldier
- Starman (Jack Knight), comic book character

== See also ==
- Jak Knight
- John Knight (disambiguation)
