= Arthur F. Knight =

Arthur Franklin Knight (1865 – May 7, 1936) was an American inventor credited with invention of steel golf clubs in 1909, who also invented the Schenectady putter.
