= John Knight (MP for Reigate, 1417) =

English politician

John Knight (fl. 1417–1427) was an English politician. He sat as MP for Reigate in 1417.
