= James A. Knight =

Psychiatrist, theologian, medical ethicist and minister

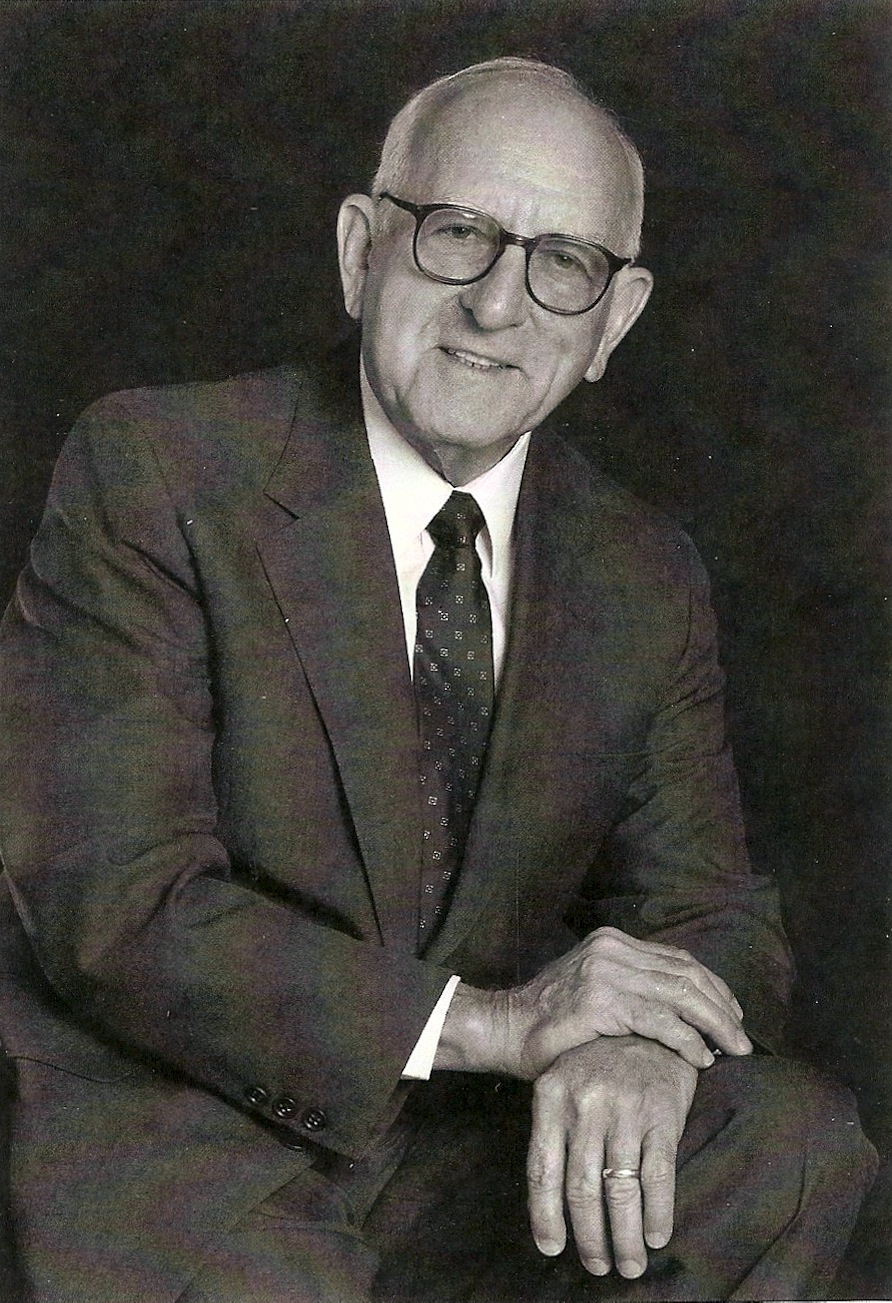
James A. Knight, MD

James A. Knight, MD (October 20, 1918 – July 17, 1998) was a psychiatrist, theologian, medical ethicist, and ordained Methodist minister. His principal contributions were in medical student development, the intersection of psychiatry and religion, ethical issues in medicine, and the understanding of conscience.

Knight was born in St. George, South Carolina, on October 20, 1918. He graduated from Wofford College and earned his MD at Vanderbilt University. He completed his post-graduate medical training at Grady Hospital in Atlanta, Georgia, and at Duke University Hospital in Durham, North Carolina. Additionally, Knight completed a Master of Divinity Degree at Duke University and a Master of Public Health degree from Tulane University.

Knight held the Harkness Chair in Psychiatry and Religion at Union Theological Seminary in New York. He then served in a variety of administrative posts, including Dean of Admissions at Tulane University School of Medicine, where he promoted the admission of people of diverse ethnic and educational backgrounds into medical school. Knight was the first Dean of the newly formed Texas A&M University College of Medicine, a post he held for five years (1973 - 1978). He subsequently left university administrative posts to finish his career as a professor at Louisiana State University School of Medicine in New Orleans and return to the Texas A&M College of Medicine as professor from 1992 - 1997.

Knight's many awards included the Distinguished Alumni Award from Wofford College in 1971, and one for his leadership of the Society for Health and Human Values.

He was a member of the Society for the Scientific Study of Religion. Knight earned a fellowship from the World Health Organization for study at the C.G. Jung Institute in Zürich, Switzerland, in 1961.

During World War II, he served as a U.S. Navy Chaplain on the USS Sanctuary Haven-class hospital ship. He died on July 17, 1998, at the age of 79.

== Selected books ==
- "Doctor-To-Be: Coping with the Trials and Triumphs of Medical School", James A. Knight, Appleton-Century-Crofts, publishers, 1981, ISBN 0-8385-1722-6.
- "A Psychiatrist Looks at Religion and Health", Abington Press, New York, 1964.
- "For the Love of Money: Human Behavior and Money", J.B. Lippincott, Philadelphia, 1968.
