= Alan Edgar Knight =

American medievalist and scholar of French literature

- Alan Edgar Knight, circa 1997
- Born: September 7, 1931; Plant City, Florida, U.S.
- Died: September 17, 2015 (aged 84); Berkeley, California, U.S.
- Education: Florida State University (B.A.); Fordham University (M.A.); Yale University (Ph.D.)
- Occupation: Medieval French literature scholar
- Employer: Pennsylvania State University
- Spouse(s): Isabel Frances Knight (m. 1963; div. 1977)
- Children: Jonathan Douglas Knight; Michael Denis Knight

Alan Edgar Knight (September 7, 1931 – September 17, 2015) was an American medievalist and scholar of French literature whose research focused on late medieval theatre and vernacular drama. He is best known for his five-volume critical edition of Les Mystères de la Procession de Lille, published by Librairie Droz between 2001 and 2011. The edition received extensive scholarly attention and was reviewed in major journals including Romania, Speculum, French Studies, Romanische Forschungen, Le Moyen Âge, and Studi Francesi.

== Early life and education ==
Knight was born in Plant City, Florida, on September 7, 1931. He enlisted in the United States Army in 1951 and served during the Korean War as a sergeant in Intelligence and Analysis at the Eighth Army Headquarters in Seoul. His service decorations included the Korean Service Medal, National Defense Service Medal, United Nations Service Medal, and the Republic of Korea Presidential Unit Citation.

Following his military service, Knight earned a B.A. in French from Florida State University in 1958, an M.A. from Fordham University in 1960, and a Ph.D. in French literature from Yale University in 1965.

== Academic career ==
Knight joined the faculty of Pennsylvania State University in 1964, where he taught medieval French literature, drama, paleography, and comparative literature. He was promoted to Associate Professor in 1970 and Professor of French in 1984, retiring as Professor Emeritus in 1997. He held a visiting professorship at Emory University in 1982.

He served as Secretary-Treasurer of the Société Internationale pour l’Étude du Théâtre Médival from 1977 to 1990 and participated in editorial and reviewing work for academic journals and university presses.

== Scholarship ==
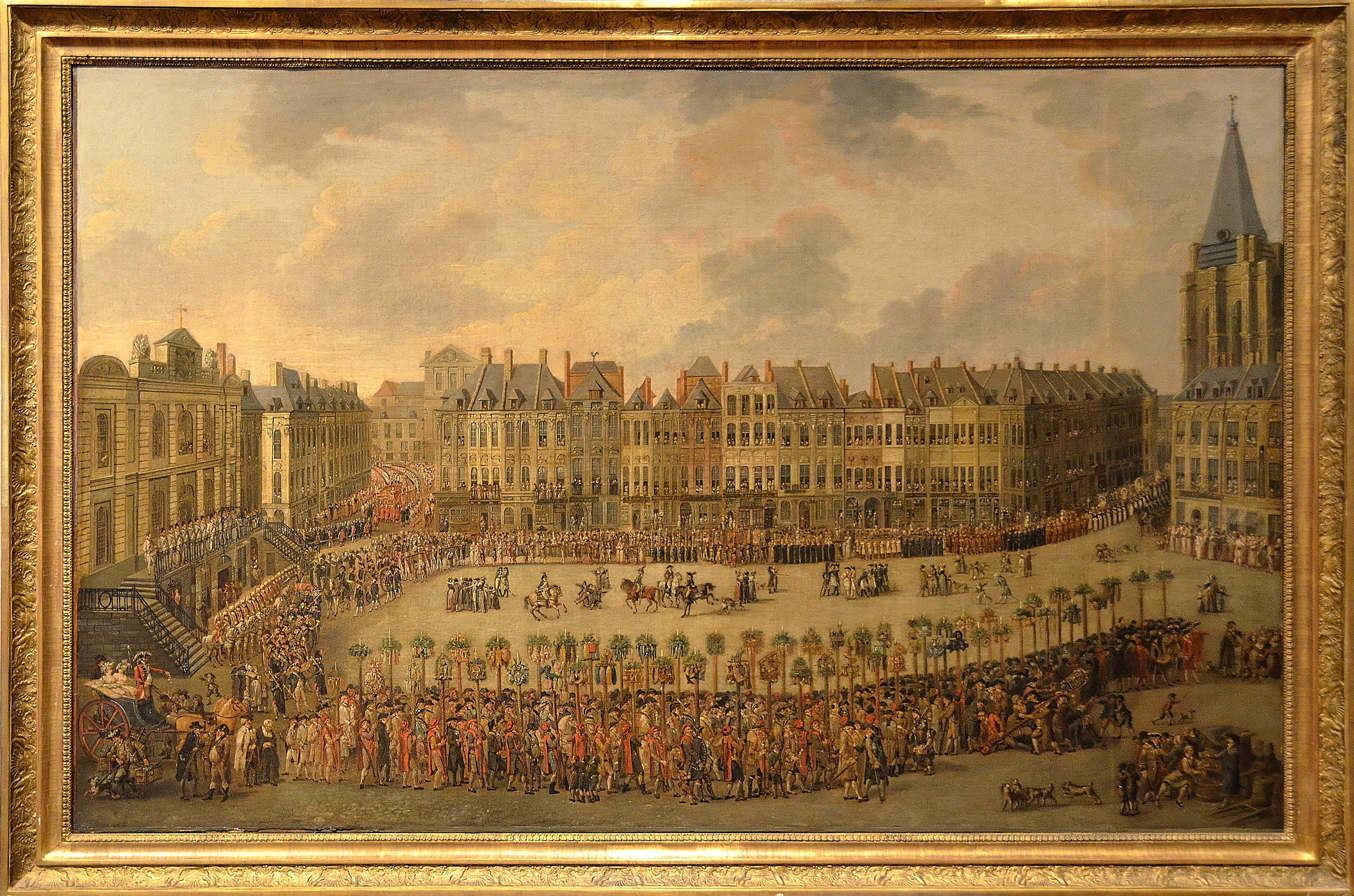
François Watteau's "La Procession de Lille de 1789" which depicts the annual festival during which the mystery plays were staged over two centuries beginning in the late 1300s.

Knight specialized in the civic theatre traditions of northern France, particularly the processional plays of Lille. His principal scholarly achievement was the critical edition of Les Mystères de la Procession de Lille, a fifteenth-century cycle of mystery plays preserved in the Herzog August Bibliothek in Wolfenbüttel, Germany. Published in five volumes between 2001 and 2011 by Librairie Droz, the edition represented more than two decades of archival and philological research and has been recognized as a major contribution to the study of medieval French drama.

Knight also published studies on medieval genre theory, civic ritual, liturgical performance, and the relationship between drama and urban identity. His monograph Aspects of Genre in Late Medieval French Drama (1983) examined the formal characteristics of fifteenth-century French plays and received scholarly review in major journals. He edited The Stage as Mirror: Civic Theatre in Late Medieval Europe (1997), which was reviewed in Theatre Research International and other venues.

== Reception ==
Knight’s work, particularly his edition of Les Mystères de la Procession de Lille, received attention in medieval studies, Romance philology, and French literary scholarship.

- In Romania, Jean-Pierre Bordier offered a detailed multi-volume review, noting the edition’s philological rigor and contribution to the understanding of civic drama.
- Speculum highlighted the editorial methodology and the significance of the corpus for theatre history.
- French Studies published multiple reviews by Jelle Koopmans, assessing the edition’s impact on the study of late medieval drama.
- Additional evaluations appeared in Romanische Forschungen, Le Moyen Âge, and Studi Francesi.

== Selected works ==
- Les Mystères de la Procession de Lille, 5 vols. (Geneva: Librairie Droz, 2001–2011).
- Aspects of Genre in Late Medieval French Drama (University Press of Florida, 1983).
- The Stage as Mirror: Civic Theatre in Late Medieval Europe (editor, Brepols, 1997).

== Death ==
Knight died on September 17, 2015, in Berkeley, California. He is buried in Oaklawn Cemetery in Plant City, Florida.
