= Shirley Knight (Canadian actress) =

Canadian television actress

- Born: Shirley Frances Knight; March 12, 1936; Drummondville, Quebec, Canada
- Died: February 5, 2009 (aged 72); Toronto, Ontario, Canada
- Occupation: Actress
- Years active: 1947–1964
- Spouse: Glynne Morris
- Children: 2

Shirley Frances Knight (12 March 1936 – 5 February 2009) was a Canadian stage, television and radio actress.

== Biography ==
Shirley spent her younger days in wartime England and emigrating with her parents to St. Catharines in 1947. There she appeared in children's plays in the "Library Story Hour" on CKTB radio station and took an active part in different drama groups. After some time Shirley began to work with professional repertory companies, including the Manitoba Theatre Center from 1956 to 1960.

Her career on television started in 1955. In the mid-1970s she became director of publicity at Canada's MacMillan. After many years as an editor, she taught acting in Cambridge, England.

== Death ==
Shirley Knight died on 5 February, 2009.

== Filmography ==
=== Actress (Films) ===
Year	Title	Role	Notes
1956	Woman Alone		NFB film (short)
1956	Borderline	Norah Fenton	NFB film (short)
1957	The Suspects	Jean	NFB film (short)

=== Actress (Television works) ===
Year	Title	Role	Notes
1955	General Motors Theatre	Neighbor girl	Episode: "The Blood Is Strong"
1955	Playbill	Various	3 episodes
1958	The Bird in a Gilded Cage		TV film
1961	Summer Circuit		Episode: "The Rosebush"
1962	Playdate	Ann	Episode: "The Reluctant Angels"
1963	Scarlett Hill	Alice	Episode: "Reunion"

=== Host ===
Year	Title	Notes
1957	Toes in Tempo	children's dance television series
1958	Nursery School Time	children's television series

== Award ==
Shirley received the gold medal with honours and diploma for acting from the London Academy of Music and Dramatic Art (LAMDA) in 1990.
