= Peter Knight =

Peter or Pete Knight may refer to:

== Music ==
- Peter Knight (composer) (1917–1985), arranger and composer
- Peter Knight (folk musician) (born 1947), member of the group Steeleye Span
- Peter Knight (musician) (born 1965), Australian musician and composer

== Sports ==
- Pete Knight (rodeo) (1903–1937), world champion rodeo bronc rider
- Peter Knight (footballer), midfielder for Oxford United F.C. from 1960 to 1964
- Peter Knight (rugby union) (1947–2015), English rugby union player

== Other ==
- Peter Knight (murderer) (born 1954), Australian convicted of the murder of a security guard in a Melbourne abortion clinic
- Peter Knight (physicist) (born 1947), British physicist
- Peter A. Knight, the creator of the TV series Kröd Mändoon and the Flaming Sword of Fire
- Peter O. Knight (1865–1946), lawyer in Tampa, Florida
- William J. Knight (1929–2004), American test pilot, astronaut and politician nicknamed "Pete"
