= Dancing Storybook =

Canadian children's television series

- Genre: Children's television
- Written by: Marian Waldman
- Country of origin: Canada
- Original language: English
- No. of seasons: 1
- No. of episodes: 13

Production
- Producer: Neil Harris
- Production location: Winnipeg

Original release
- Network: CBC Television
- Release: 1 April – 24 June 1959

Dancing Storybook is a Canadian children's television series that aired on CBC Television in 1959.

== Premise ==
This Winnipeg-produced children's show featured performances from the Royal Winnipeg Ballet, who previously performed in CBC's Toes in Tempo series. The series plot involves two youths, Woody (Wally Martin) and Sue (Sheila McKinnon), who look for a patch from their father's magic jacket. Eric Wild, principal conductor of the Royal Winnipeg Ballet at that time, was the series musical director.

== Scheduling ==
The half-hour series aired on Wednesdays at 5 p.m. from 1 April to 24 June 1959.
