= Alan Knight (Australian footballer) =

Australian rules footballer

Personal information
- Full name: Alan Joseph Knight
- Born: 16 March 1936
- Died: 6 July 2020 (aged 84)
- Original team: South Melbourne Districts
- Height: 179 cm (5 ft 10 in)
- Weight: 83 kg (183 lb)

Playing career^{1}
Years	Club	Games (Goals)
1957	South Melbourne	3 (0)
- ^{1} Playing statistics correct to the end of 1957.

Alan Joseph Knight (16 March 1936 – 6 July 2020) was an Australian rules footballer who played for the South Melbourne Football Club in the Victorian Football League (VFL).
