= Elizabeth Knight (disambiguation) =

Elizabeth Knight (1944–2005) was an English actress.

Elizabeth Knight may also refer to:

- Elizabeth Knight (physician) (1869–1933), British physician and suffragette
- Elizabeth Gertrude Britton (née Knight; 1858–1934), American botanist
- Elizabeth Hawkins Knight (1827–1886), settler in colonial Victoria, Australia
