= Edward H. Knight =

Edward Henry Knight (1 June 1824, London - 22 January 1883, Bellefontaine, Ohio) was a United States mechanical expert.

== Biography ==
He was educated at the Friends' school in England. He studied surgery, engraving, mechanics, and civil engineering, and emigrated to the United States in 1845. He settled in Cincinnati, where he became a patent lawyer for several years, and then worked at agricultural pursuits.

In 1863, he accepted a position in the United States Patent Office in Washington, D.C., to work on the preparation of the annual reports. He also acting as surgeon under the United States Christian Commission. The meagre reports that were then issued at governmental expense for gratuitous distribution by the Patent Office were replaced by him in 1871 by the Official Gazette of the United States Patent-Office, which was issued as a profitable weekly publication. He also organized the classification of inventions.

He was a member of the international juries at the World's Fairs in Philadelphia and Atlanta, was United States commissioner to the World's Fair in Paris in 1878, and was made a chevalier of the Legion of Honor by the French government in recognition for his services at the last-named fair. He edited the Reports of the Paris Exposition, to which he contributed chapters on “Agricultural Implements” and “Clocks and Watches.” Besides many official reports, he wrote the American Mechanical Dictionary (3 vol., 1876), the New Mechanical Dictionary (Boston, 1884), and “A Study of the Savage Weapons at the Centennial Exhibition” (in the Smithsonian Institution's Annual Report for 1879, p. 213, Washington, 1880). He compiled A Library of Poetry and Song (New York, 1870; revised ed., 1876).

He received the degree of LL.D. in 1876 from Iowa Wesleyan College. His brain was found to weigh 64 ounces, being the second largest on record, that of Cuvier weighing 64½ ounces.
