= Christopher Knight (cricketer) =

English cricketer (born 1972)

Personal information
- Full name: Christopher George Knight
- Born: 1 December 1972 (age 53); Taunton, Somerset, England
- Batting: Right-handed
- Bowling: Right-arm medium

Domestic team information
- Years: Team
- 2001: Hampshire Cricket Board

Career statistics
Competition	List A
Matches	2
Runs scored	11
Batting average	–
100s/50s	0/0
Top score	11*
Balls bowled	48
Wickets	0
Bowling average	–
5 wickets in innings	–
10 wickets in match	–
Best bowling	–
Catches/stumpings	0/–
- Source: Cricinfo, 28 December 2009

Christopher George Knight (born 1 December 1972) is a former English cricketer. Knight was a right-handed batsman who bowled right-arm medium pace. He was born at Taunton in 1972.

Knight made his List-A debut for the Hampshire Cricket Board in the 1st Round of the 2001 Cheltenham and Gloucester Trophy against the Kent Cricket Board. Knight's final List-A match came in 2nd Round of the 2002 Cheltenham and Gloucester Trophy, which was played in 2001 against Ireland.

Knight made a single appearance in the 1993 Second Eleven Championship for Hampshire Second XI against Leicestershire Second XI.
