= Samuel Knight =

Samuel Knight may refer to:

- Samuel Knight (architect) (1834–1911), English architect
- Samuel Knight (bishop) (1868–1932), Bishop of Jarrow, 1924–1932
- Samuel Knight (judge) (1731–1804), Vermont Supreme Court Justice
- Samuel Knight (priest) (1675–1746), English priest and antiquary
- Samuel Howell Knight (1892–1975), American geologist

== See also ==
- Sammy Knight (born 1975), American football player
- Sam Norton-Knight, Australian rugby union player
