= Robert K. Knight =

Clark College President (2007-2019)

Robert Kennedy "Bob" Knight (March 19, 1957-December 15, 2024) was the President of Clark College in Vancouver, Washington from August 2007 to 2019.

== Career ==
Knight received his undergraduate degree in engineering from the United States Military Academy at West Point in 1980 and earned an executive MBA at Golden Gate University in San Francisco. He has done postgraduate work in organizational effectiveness at Chapman University in Fort Lewis, Washington.

Knight served more than 21 years in the United States Army as an infantry officer and airborne Army Ranger before retiring as a lieutenant colonel. His last duty in the army was as commander of Vancouver Barracks in Vancouver, Washington.

Knight joined Clark College in 2004 as vice president of Administrative Services. In 2006, he became acting president. Knight began serving as the president of Clark College in Vancouver, Washington, in August 2007. During his tenure, the college went from being state funded to state assisted with funding dropping from roughly 62% to under 40%. During his time at the University, Knight would preside over award ceremonies.

Knight retired from Clark College in 2019.

== Personal life ==
He was born in England. He died on December 15, 2024. He was remembered as a "force of nature" and "one of a kind" by friends and colleagues.
