= G. A. Frank Knight =

Scottish minister, author and advocate of the Temperance Movement

George Alexander Frank Knight FRSE (1869–1937) was a Scottish minister, author and advocate of the Temperance Movement. In literature he is usually referred to as G. A. Frank Knight.

== Life ==
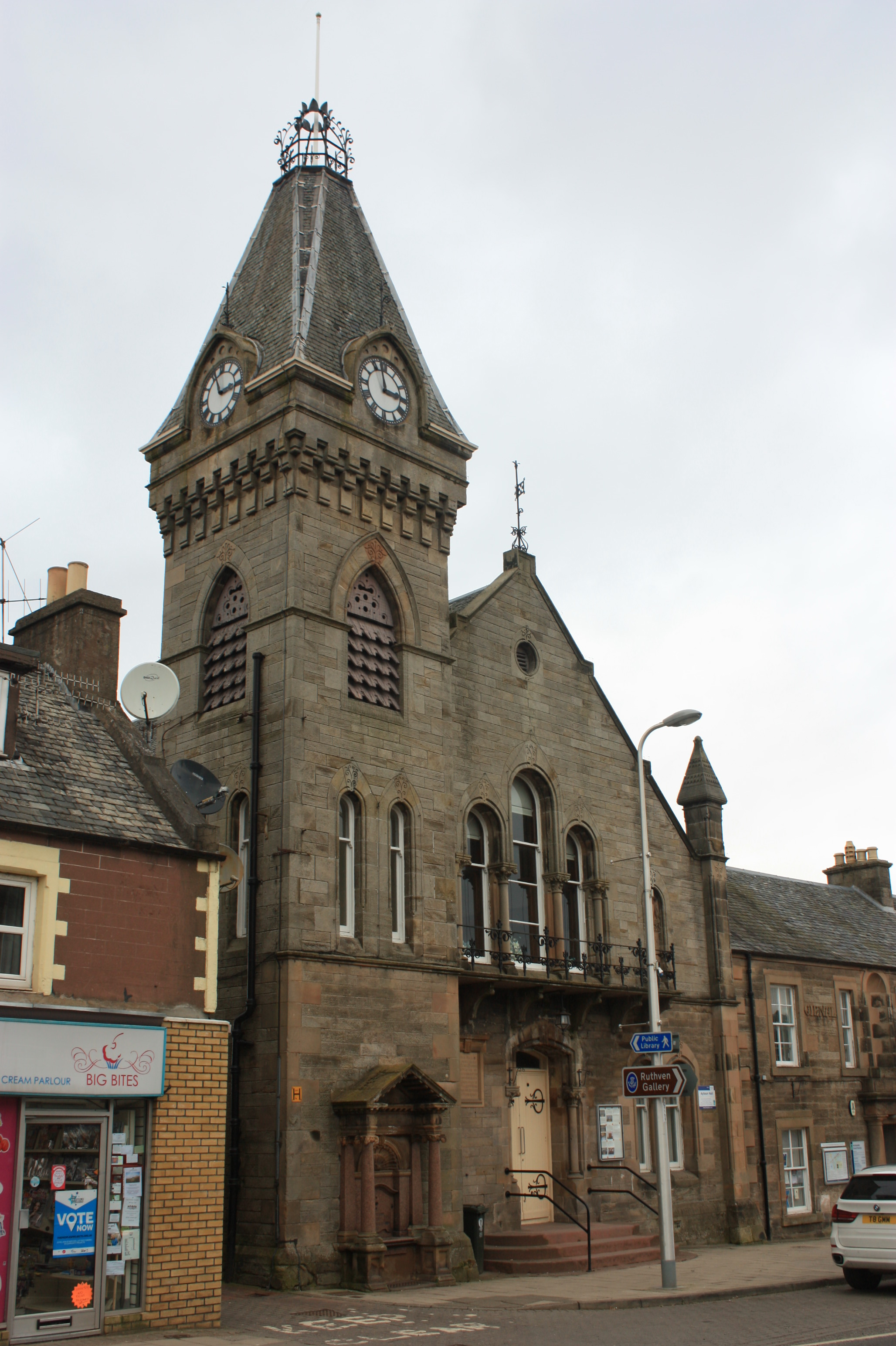
Auchterarder Free Church

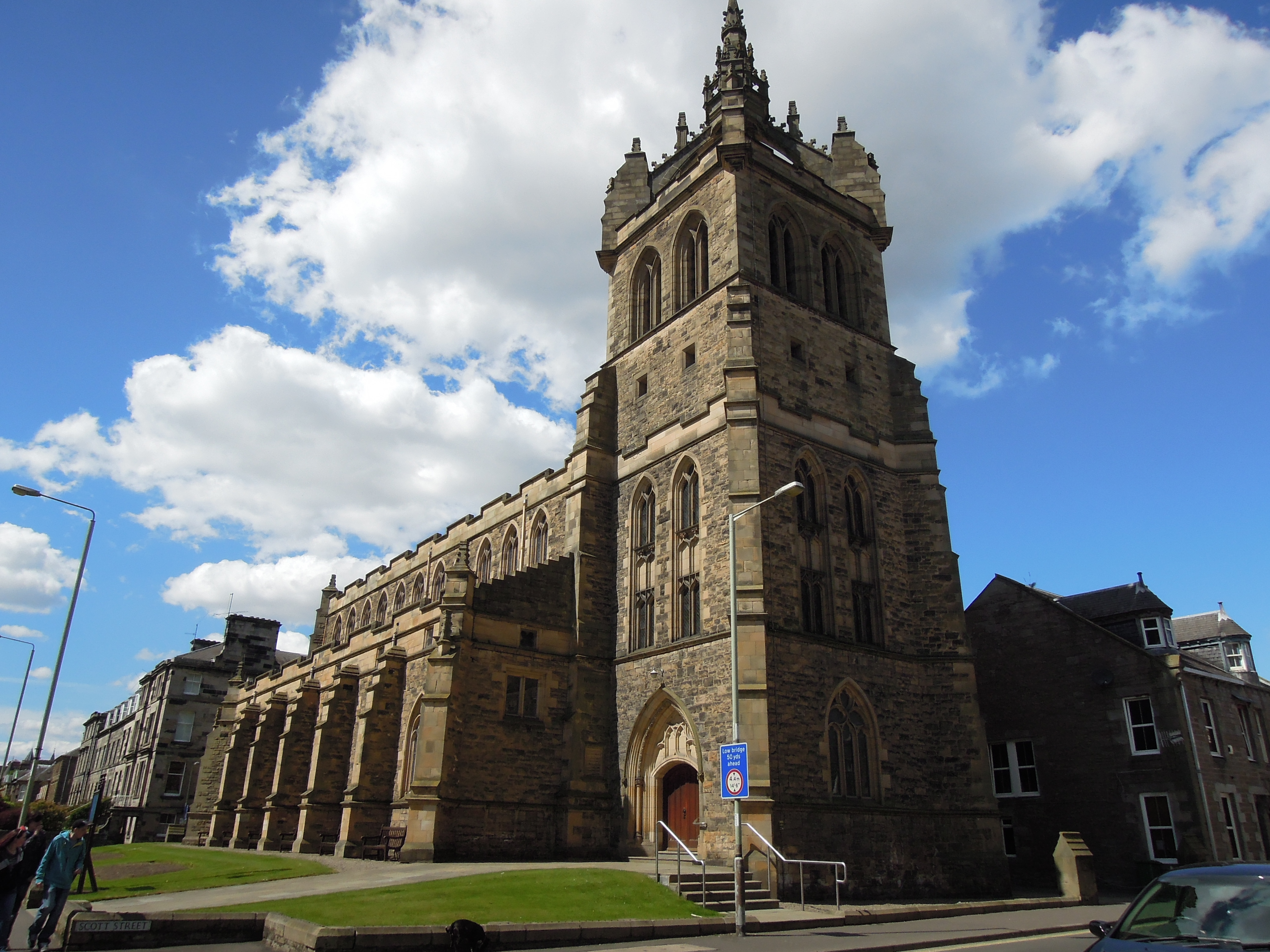
St. Leonards-in-the-Fields, Perth

He was born in the Free Church manse in Dollar, Clackmannanshire, in 1869, the son of Rev George Halley Knight and his wife Marianne Sommerville, and grandson of the Rev George Fulton Knight and nephew of the Rev William Angus Knight.

He was educated at Dollar Academy. He then studied at Aberdeen University and Glasgow University graduating MA before studying Divinity at the Free Church College in Glasgow.

He began preaching at the Free Church of Scotland in Auchterarder around 1892. In 1900, on the creation of the United Free Church of Scotland he moved to St Leonards-in-the-Fields Church, Perth. He was elected a fellow of the Royal Society of Edinburgh in 1901. His proposers were Malcolm Laurie, Robert Kidston, William Evans Hoyle and John Gray McKendrick. In 1907 he was living at 9 St Leonards Bank on the South Inch in Perth.

In 1914 succeeded Rev Dr Reith at Kelvingrove United Free Church. He was then living at 52 Sardinia Terrace in Glasgow.

In 1928 he took on the role of general secretary to the National Bible Society of Scotland. He died suddenly on 2 May 1937.

== Family ==
He married Annie Baillie Adamson, daughter of Rev Thomas Adamson of the Free Church of Scotland.

His namesake grandson, generally known as G. A. F. Knight in literature, was also a Biblical scholar and served as the moderator of the General Assembly of the Presbyterian Church of New Zealand in 1974.

== Publications ==
- The Marine Mollusca of Port Stewart, Northern Ireland (1901)
- Greatheart (1914)
- Nile and Jordan (1921)
- Archaeological Light on the Early Christianizing of Scotland (1933)
