= Son of Scarface =

Autobiography

Son of Scarface: A Memoir by the Grandson of Al Capone
- Author: Chris W. Knight
- Publisher: Seven Locks Press
- Pages: 294
- ISBN: 978-0615156651
- OCLC: 191702872

Son of Scarface: A Memoir by the Grandson of Al Capone is an autobiography by Chris W. Knight, who alleges that his father was the hidden son of gangster Al Capone.

== Synopsis ==
The autobiography chronicles the author’s broken childhood as he uncovers family secrets that his abusive mother attempted to keep him and his sister from pursuing.

As an adult he seeks the truth about both his grandfather and his father, who used a fraudulent birth certificate. After years of genealogical research and interviews of close family friends Chris Knight concludes that his father is a hidden son of Al Capone.

== Author ==
Chris W. Knight.
