= Donald Knight =

Donald Knight is the name of:

- Donald Knight (cricketer) (1894–1960), English cricketer
- Donald Knight (figure skater) (born 1947), Canadian figure skater
- Don Knight (actor) (1933–1997), English movie, television, and stage actor
- Don Knight (politician) (born 1942), Canadian politician
- Don Knight (Manitoba politician)
