= Anne Knight (children's writer) =

British writer (1792–1860)

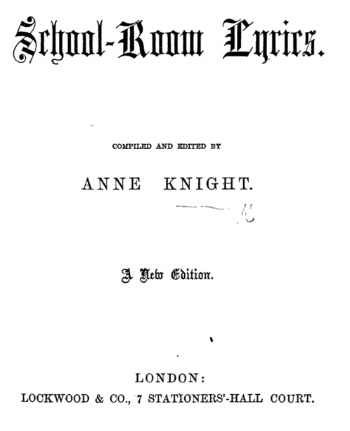
School-Room Lyrics by Anne Knight

Anne Knight (born Anne Waspe; 28 October 1792 in Woodbridge, Suffolk – 11 December 1860 in Woodbridge, Suffolk) was a Quaker children's writer and educationalist. She wrote Mornings in the Library (c. 1828) and Mary Gray. Her book, A tale for little girls, (1831) includes poems by her lodger and fellow Quaker Bernard Barton.

== Life ==
Anne was the eldest of the eight children of Jonathan Waspe (c. 1756 – 1818), a leather cutter, and his wife Phebe Gibbs (1761–1851). She married a cousin and fellow Quaker, James Knight (1794–1820) of Southwark, but returned to Woodbridge after his early death.

By 1826, Anne Knight was keeping a Woodbridge school. She was a friend of the poet Bernard Barton, who lodged with her and her sisters, and she is therefore mentioned several times in letters to him from Charles Lamb: "Your book... we cannot thank you for more sincerely than for the introduction you favoured us with to Anne Knight." "So A. K. keeps a school... she teaches nothing wrong, I'll answer for't."

Anne Knight died at her home in Woodbridge on 11 December 1860 and she was buried in the nearby Quaker burial ground.

== Writings ==
Anne Knight was the author of several children's books, some of which have been erroneously attributed to her Quaker namesake and contemporary Anne Knight (1786–1862), a campaigner for women's rights. They include School-Room Lyrics (1846), and probably Poetic Gleanings (1827), Mornings in the Library (London, c. 1828, with an introductory poem by Bernard Barton), Mary Gray. A tale for little girls (also including a Barton verse, London, 1831), and Lyriques français: pour la jeunesse. Morceaux choisis par A. K. (3rd e., Norwich, 1869).

Knight's verses are well crafted and her stories well told, but they exhibit a didacticism that does not suit modern tastes. To take an example: "'Though these animals [rabbits] are so small,' continued Mrs. Gray, 'they are found very serviceable to man. Their flesh is good to eat, and the soft grey fur, growing close to the skin, is made into hats, when mixed with the beautiful fine down of the beaver, a curious animal found in North America'" (Mary Gray, p. 11).
