= Phillip Knight (footballer) =

Australian rules footballer

Personal information
- Born: 14 October 1963 (age 63)
- Original team: MHSOB
- Height: 178 cm (5 ft 10 in)
- Weight: 78 kg (172 lb)

Playing career^{1}
Years	Club	Games (Goals)
1985–1988	Fitzroy	33 (21)
- ^{1} Playing statistics correct to the end of 1988.

Phillip Knight is a former Australian rules footballer, who played for the Fitzroy Football Club in the Victorian Football League (VFL).

== Career ==
Knight played for Fitzroy from the 1985 season to the 1988 season.
