= Margaret K. Knight =

British psychologist, secular humanist advocate, and radio presenter

- Born: 23 November 1903; Hertfordshire, England
- Died: 10 May 1983 (aged 79)
- Spouse: Arthur Rex Knight

Academic background
- Education: Girton College, Cambridge

Academic work
- Discipline: psychology
- Institutions: University of Aberdeen
- Notable works: A Modern Introduction to Psychology

Margaret Kennedy Knight (née Horsey) (23 November 1903 – 10 May 1983) was a British psychologist and humanist.

== Biography ==
Born in Hertfordshire, England, Knight went to Girton College, Cambridge, graduating in 1926. In 1948, she gained a master's degree.

It was in her third year at Cambridge that she found the "moral courage", as she put it, finally to abandon the religious beliefs she had long been uneasy with. In the preface to her book Morals Without Religion (1955), she wrote, "a fresh, cleansing wind swept through the stuffy room that contained the relics of my religious beliefs. I let them go with a profound sense of relief, and ever since I have lived happily without them."

Between 1926 and 1936 Margaret worked as a librarian, information officer and editor for journal published by the National Institute of Industrial Psychology. She married her husband Arthur Rex Knight in 1936, then in 1938 she started working alongside him as an assistant lecturer in psychology at the University of Aberdeen, Scotland. Ten years later in 1948 she was promoted to lecturer in psychology, a post she held till her retirement in 1970.

In collaboration with her husband, Knight wrote A Modern Introduction to Psychology (1948), which went through many editions.

An advocate of Scientific Humanism, Knight gave two short radio talks on the BBC Home Service in 1955 under the title Morals Without Religion. The first talk was broadcast on 5 January and caused a storm of controversy. The Sunday Graphic headline described her as "The Unholy Mrs. Knight", and called her "a menace".

== Publications ==
- Honest to Man: Christian ethics reexamined (1974). London: Elek/Pemberton. ISBN 0-236-31002-X
- Humanist Anthology: from Confucius to Bertrand Russell (1961). London: Barrie and Rockliff. (Editor)
- Morals without religion : and other essays (1955). London: Dobson. (Includes the text of the two BBC talks)
- William James; A Selection From His Writings on Psychology (1950) Middlesex: Penguin/Pelican. (Editor)
- A Modern Introduction to Psychology (with Rex Knight) (1st edition, 1948). London: University Tutorial Press.
