= John "Julius" Knight =

American house music producer, remixer and DJ

John "Julius" Knight, sometimes known as JJK, is an American house music producer, remixer and DJ.

Born in New York City, Knight which started DJing in clubs in NY and Boston, before releasing his first EP, Knighttime Funk, in 1996 on Marc Pomeroy's Soulfuric Trax. Knight worked with Pomeroy and Pomeroy's partner, Brian Tappert in a cover of the Stevie Wonder song "All I Do", released under the name Cleptomaniacs with vocals by Bryan Chambers, which reached the UK Top 40.

Currently, JJK is a resident DJ in various clubs in Miami, and continues to release works on established labels such as Soulfuric and Defected Records.
