= Jessie Knight (tattoo artist) =

First female tattoo artist in the UK

- Born: 1904; Croydon, South London, England, UK
- Died: 1992 (aged 87–88); Barry, South Wales, Wales, UK
- Education: Charlie Bell
- Known for: Tattoo artist

Jessie Marjorie Knight (8 January 1904–1992) was the first prominent female tattoo artist in the UK.

== Personal life ==
Jessie Knight was born in Croydon in South London, in 1904, one of eight children. Her family worked in circuses and she was involved in sharp-shooting and riding acts. She was married aged 27, but this only lasted eight years. She died in Barry, South Wales, in 1992.

== Career as tattoo artist ==
Knight began as a tattoo artist in 1921 when she was 18, having learnt how to tattoo from her father. She worked in Barry, South Wales. She was later an apprentice with Charlie Bell in Kent. She then moved to her own tattoo shops in Portsmouth and subsequently Aldershot. Many of her clients were women. She returned to Barry in 1968 and continued working into the 1980s.

Her style was to work freehand after drawing the design onto the body.

In 1955 her tattoo of a highland fling won second prize in the Champion Tattoo Artist of All England competition held in London.

== Legacy ==
Her work was included in an exhibition at the National Maritime Museum Cornwall, from March 2017 to January 2018, showing a history of British tattooing. Tatty Devine has made a brooch and a necklace using an original design of Jessie Knight. Skin Digging, an exhibition of work by and owned by Jessie Knight from the collection of Neil Hopkin-Thomas was on display January 18 - February 18, 2018 at the Art Exchange gallery on the University of Essex campus in Colchester. Knight was one of the tattoo artists featured in an exhibition about the history of British tattooing at Chatham Historic Dockyard in 2020. However, due to the COVID-19 pandemic, the event was cancelled.

A collection of Knight's machines, flash (designs), art and photos is held at St Fagans National Museum of History near Cardiff.
