= Charles Parsons Knight =

English painter

Charles Parsons Knight (15 February 1829 – 22 January 1897) was an English painter.

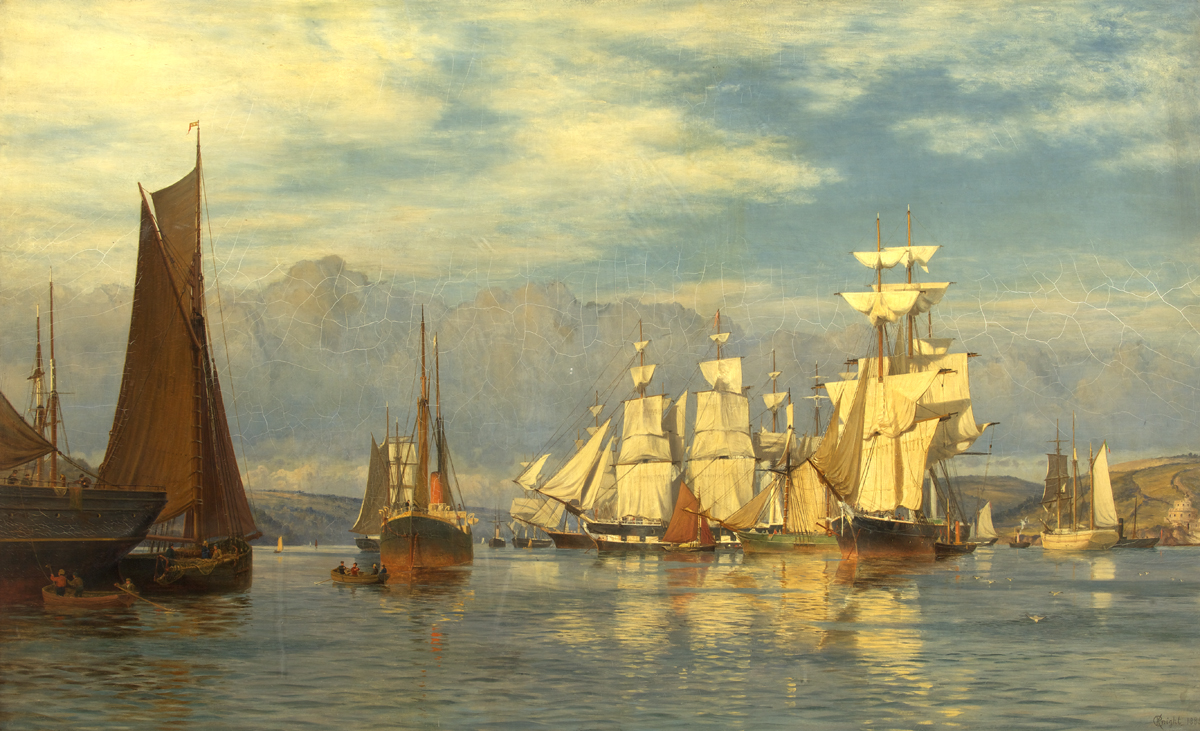
Falmouth Harbour, by Charles Parsons Knight

== Biography ==
He was born at Bristol, the fifth son of the Rev. Canon Knight, rector of Saint Michael's. He was educated by his father, who was a scholar, and the friend of the artists and literary men of Bristol: George Cumberland, Sr., the Rev. John Eagrles, John Bird, R.A., and others. As a boy Charles Knight loved and drew the shipping of the old Port of Bristol. He entered Messrs. Green's service as a midshipman, but after one voyage to Calcutta and back he gave up the profession. This experience strengthened his love of the sea as a subject for art. He then pursued art studies under no regular master, but drew and painted in the life school of the Bristol Academy.

His first works were studies of scenery in Somerset and Devon. He first exhibited in London, at the Suffolk Street Galleries, in 1853, a picture called “The Mumbles Head, Glamorganshire.” His first contribution to the Royal Academy was “Durham from the North,” in 1857. This was succeeded by “A Bit of Riverside,” in 1858. “The Stone Walls of Old England—Speeton Cliffs, Yorkshire,” in 1861, was a noted work. Altogether, he exhibited some 110 pictures in London, mostly views of the coast, noted for the drawing of waves, rigging, and hulls of ships, and for the study of cloud and light effects.
