= Barry Knight (footballer) =

Australian rules footballer

Personal information
- Full name: Barry Knight
- Born: 16 August 1945 (age 81)
- Height: 191 cm (6 ft 3 in)
- Weight: 87 kg (192 lb)

Playing career^{1}
Years	Club	Games (Goals)
1967, 1969	Fitzroy	4 (2)
- ^{1} Playing statistics correct to the end of 1969.

Barry Knight (born 16 August 1945) is a former Australian rules footballer who played for the Fitzroy Football Club in the Victorian Football League (VFL).
