= Llandough Castle =

Medieval tower house in the Vale of Glamorgan, Wales

Coordinates: 51°26′49″N 3°26′52″W

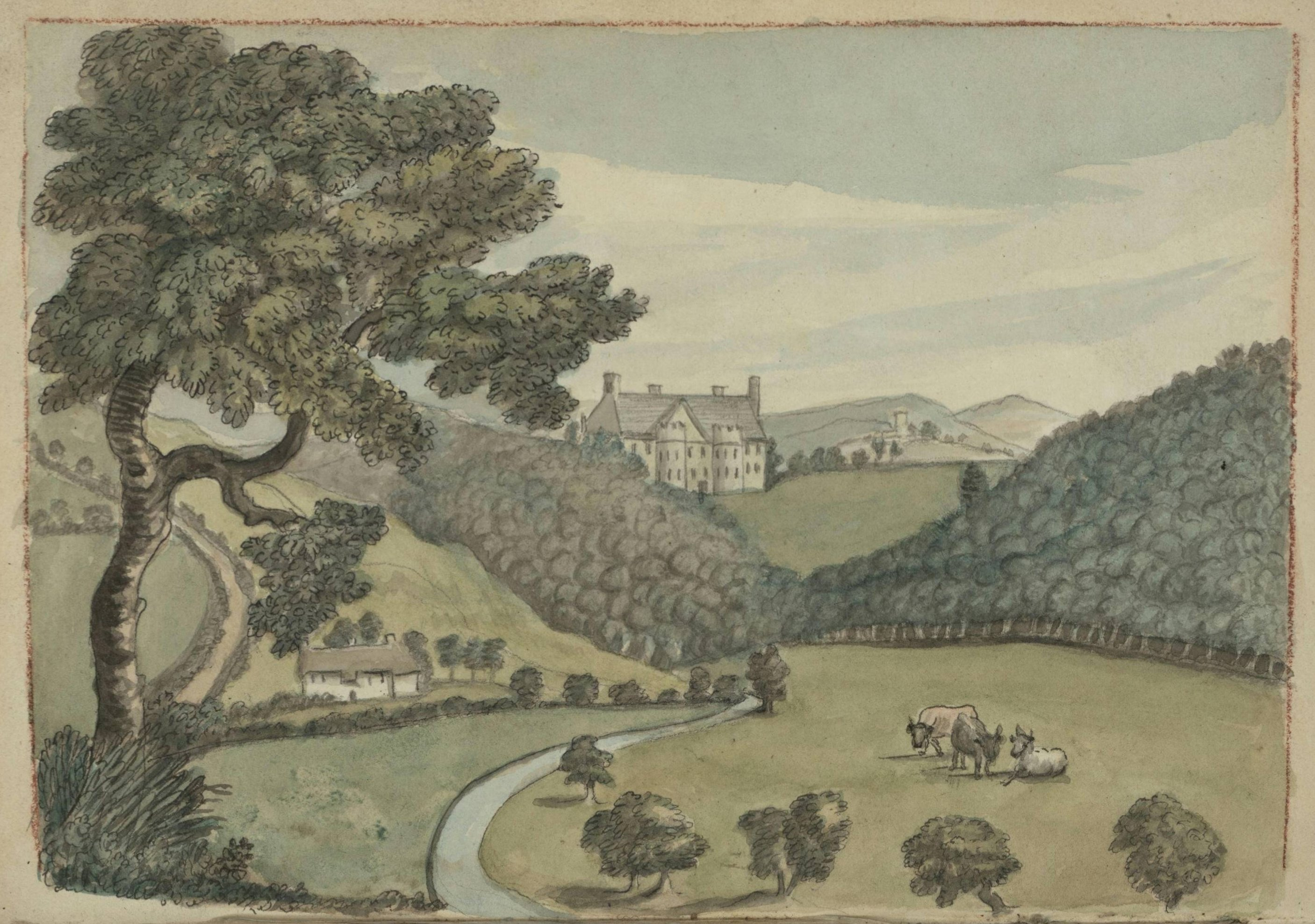
A watercolour painting of Llandough Castle by Charles Byrne in 1789

Llandough Castle is a 14th-century tower house located in the Vale of Glamorgan, South Wales. Initially constructed as a fortified residential manor, the property is well preserved and has undergone many structural additions. It is currently a private residence Llandough Castle was assigned Grade II* listed building status in 1981.

== Historical ownership ==
Llandough Castle was constructed in the 14th century as a private residence and has remained as such for most of its lifespan. Records show that it was part of the Herbert estate during the 15th century, before being purchased by Dr Edward Carne in 1536. Through marriage the castle became part of the Talbot family's Penrice and Margam estate in 1677 and was subsequently leased to various private owners throughout the 18th century. Llandough Castle underwent extensive structural revisions in the 19th century by renting occupants, in particular John Price and Francis Edmonde Stacey.

Sold in 1929, Llandough Castle has since remained a private residential property, though in the 1930s it was temporarily used as an educational centre for young boys working in the local mines.

== Remaining features ==
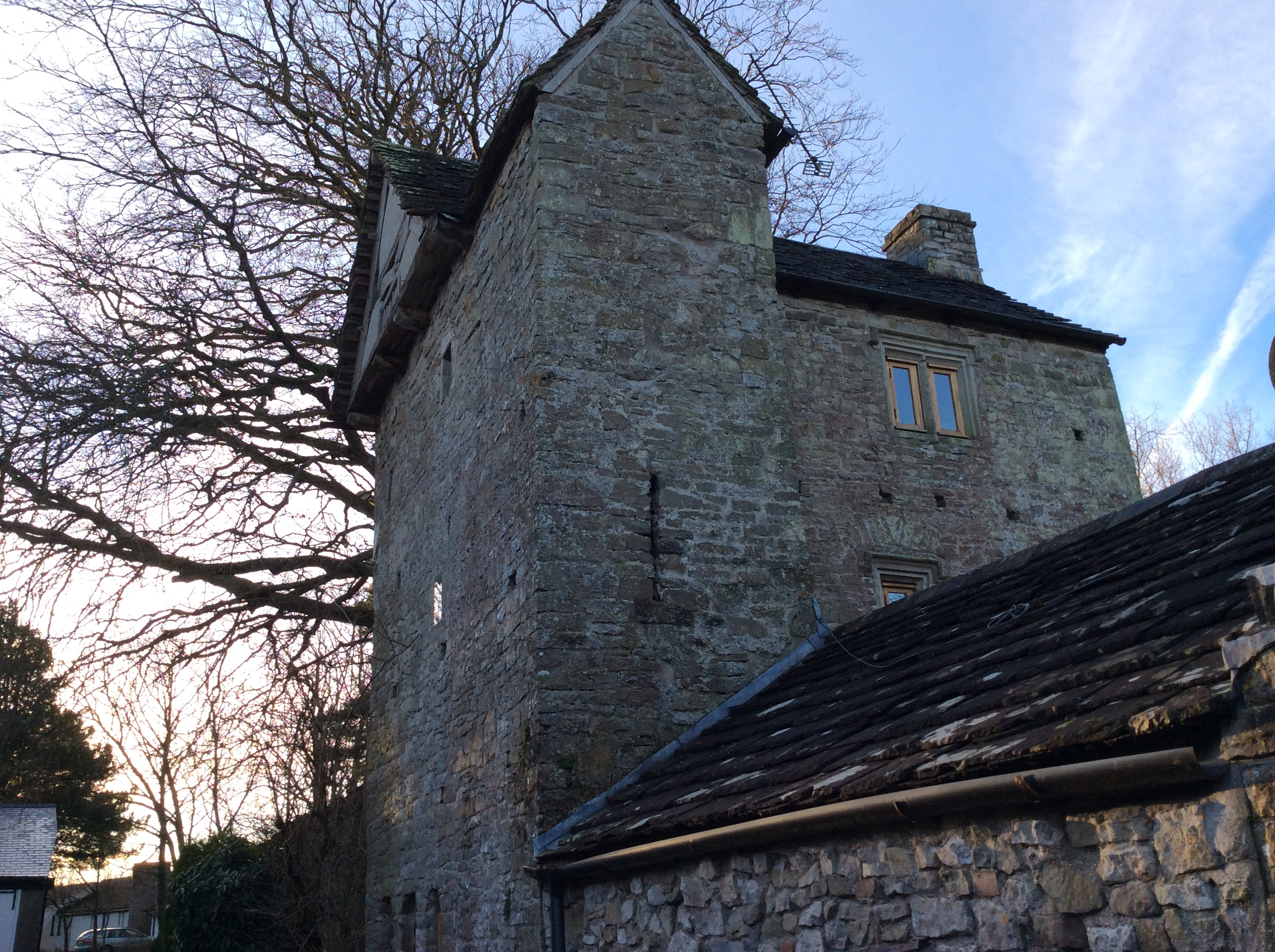
The oldest part of Llandough Castle

=== Castle ===
The castle building itself is well preserved, though most of the structure, bar one wall, is not the original 14th-century construction. Present day Llandough Castle is a roughly square-shaped building of 24m length, set behind tall boundary walls. Frequent renovation work occurred during the 19th century, including the incorporation of the West Tower into the main structure and construction of the East Wing. Minor changes were made to the interior layout of the castle after World War II, including alterations to the central part of the structure and the repurposing of the servants quarters.

=== Gardens ===
Llandough Castle is surrounded by almost 4 acres of gardens. William Harkness, the head gardener between 1869 and 1900, is largely credited with the development and preservation of the gardens. After World War II the gardens fell into disrepair, becoming neglected and sold off. After 9 years of design and cultivation by garden owners Simon and Rhian Rees, the gardens opened to the public in 2018 as part of the National Garden Scheme.
