= Minnie Everett =

(1874–1956) dancer and producer

Minnie Rebecca Everett
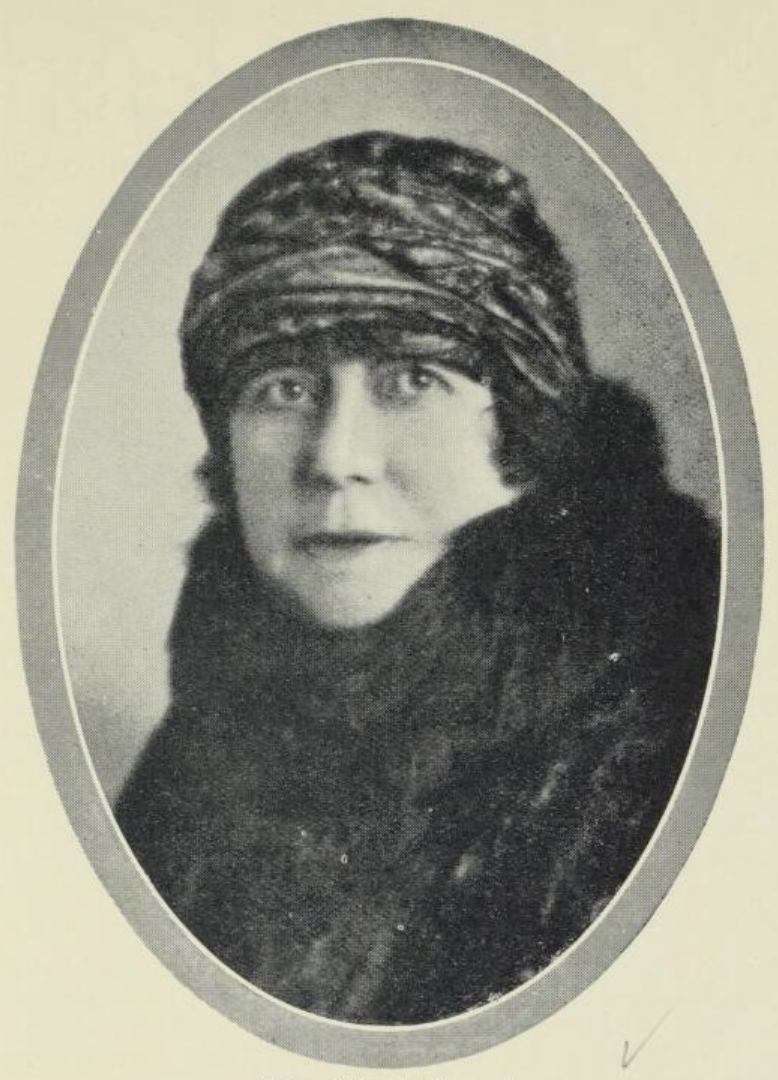
- in 1927
- Born: 28 June 1874; Beaufort, Victoria, Australia
- Died: 7 June 1956 (aged 81)
- Known for: first woman producer of Gilbert and Sullivan operettas

Minnie Everett (28 June 1874 – 7 June 1956) was an Australian ballet-mistress and theatre and opera producer, closely associated with the J. C. Williamson's theatre company. She was the world's first woman producer of Gilbert and Sullivan operettas.

== Early life ==
Everett was born in Beaufort, Victoria to Eliza Ann Everett, née Hardy, (c. 1836 – 24 August 1906) and George Everett, a bricklayer, later builder, migrants from England. After the family moved to Melbourne, Minnie attended Bell Street State School, where her talent for dancing was encouraged by a teacher, M. Massartie, (Note: Here M. may be an initial rather than the usual abbrev. for "Monsieur", and the widow of Gustave Massartie, who died 11 December 1885, aged 53.) who also inculcated in her a love of the French language.

== Career ==
Her first stage experience was a small part in the Leopold troupe's production of Uncle Tom's Cabin. At age 13, she was engaged by the Simonsen Grand Italian Opera Company, who were playing at the Alexandra Theatre (later Her Majesty's), under ballet-mistress Emilia Pasta. (Note: Signora Pasta had performed as a danseuse with the Royal Italian Opera in Australia 1876–1879, later conducted ballet classes in Melbourne until at least 1914.)

In 1888, she appeared for Williamson, Garner and Musgrove in the pantomime Sinbad the Sailor at the Theatre Royal. This was the beginning of a long relationship with what became "The Firm" of J. C. Williamson's. Williamson was so pleased with the ballet that he organised special coaching from E. W. "Teddy" Royce and the strict Mrs Royce (Marie Reddall) for eight of the dancers, including Everett. In 1891 the "Royal Ballerinas" (named for the theatre) consisted of Laura Healy, Lucy Cobb, Ethel Dale, Minnie Everett, Mildred Osborne, Lizzie Cassellis, Katie Ward, Annie Clifford, Lillie Forbes, Vera de Lissa, Nina Prince, and Jessie McLean.

In January–February 1894, they appeared in the pantomime Aladdin at Her Majesty's, and at the conclusion of their act, were conveyed to the Princess's Theatre to appear in the comic opera Dorothy, starring Nellie Stewart. In 1894 Williamson's Royal Ballerinas (by this time consisting of Healy, Cobb, Dale, Everett, Osborne, and Cassellis) became an integral part of the Royal Comic Opera Company.

Everett was introduced to Gilbert and Sullivan opera in The Gondoliers at Her Majesty's Theatre, Brisbane in July 1891, and in September The Mikado with Nellie Stewart as Yum Yum and the "domineering" Howard Vernon as the Lord High Executioner.

=== As choreographer ===
She left Williamson to work as ballet mistress for Henry Bracy in 1896. Their first production was Karl Millöcker's The Beggar Student at the Sydney Lyceum, for which she choreographed a grand Polish mazurka ballet. The operetta proved a financial failure and bankruptcy appeared imminent, so when J. C. Williamson offered a similar position, as Madame Phillipini's future replacement, she accepted. In the meantime she worked with comedian George Lauri's troupe, touring country centres; a dismal season that terminated with the loss of his scenery and props in a theatre fire at Bourke.

In November 1898, as promised, JCW appointed Everett as ballet mistress, Madame Phillipini having left to return to England. (Note: Rosalie Phillipini died in 1931.) In 1898 she created the dances for The Geisha and led the corps. She appeared as Williamson's première danseuse of the Royal Ballerinas, of which in 1899 she was made (first Australian-born) director. She returned to Sydney and was immediately put to work by Williamson in a pantomime starring Ada Reeve as Robin Hood. Another pantomime, The Forty Thieves followed in 1899, then Owen Hall's well received reworking of The Geisha, with Everett's choreography, the cast including her sister Lily Everett and George Lauri. Lauri took his own life a few years later.

In 1914, she produced pantomimes in South Africa for Williamson; in 1916 she produced High Jinks in London to become the "toast of the town".

As ballet mistress for thirty years, she created and produced dances for most of J. C. Williamson Ltd's productions. A famous story has her rebuking the 16-year-old Robert Helpman, who had no doubts as to his star quality, "You'll never be any good as a dancer", and demoted him to understudy. Hazel Meldrum was for years her assistant, also to Minnie Hooper, before she founded a school of her own.

=== Gilbert and Sullivan 1920 ===
Everett was producer for the Williamsons' grand opera season of 1920, which marked her first collaboration with Gustave Slapoffski, JCW's conductor and musical director since 1900. It was followed. at Her Majesty's Theatre, Melbourne, by a very successful season of G & S operas:

- The Mikado opened 7 August 1920, with Charles Walenn as the Lord High Executioner, Frederick Hobbs in the name part, and James Hay as Nanki Poo, to favorable notices.
- The Yeomen of the Guard from 21 August, with Walenn as Jack Point and Strella Wilson as Elsie Maynard
- Iolanthe from 4 September was an unexpected success.
- The Gondoliers from 18 September. Walenn starred again as the Duke of Plaza-Toro, with the English comedian Albert Kavanagh as the Grand Inquisitor and Ethel Morrison as the Duchess. Everett was called to take the audience' applause at the final curtain.
- Patience from 9 October
- HMS Pinafore opened 16 October. Everett choreographed a hornpipe dance to extend the second act, but though well received by the audience was not welcomed by one reviewer.
- The Pirates of Penzance from 6 November with Strella Wilson as Mabel and Villiers Arnold as Samuel.

The Sydney season opened with The Mikado at Her Majesty's Theatre on 27 November, followed by Yeoman of the Guard, Iolanthe, The Gondoliers, Patience, Pinafore, and The Pirates of Penzance. and closed with The Mikado in March 1921. They returned to Melbourne, to play Princess Ida at the Tivoli, with a farewell performance by Strella Wilson.

=== Gilbert and Sullivan 1926 ===
JCW's Gilbert and Sullivan season began at the Theatre Royal, Adelaide on 3 April with The Gondoliers for the first week, followed by Yeomen. Walenn, Wilson and Hay had rejoined the company; Leo Darnton, Sydney Granville, and Winifred Williamson were new to Australia and Patti Russell, Mabel Gibson, Bernard Manning, and Lance Fairfax were new to the company. The musical director was Harry Jacobs. That theatre later saw Australia's first professional production of Ruddigore on 23 June 1927, produced by James Hay, almost 20 years after the first amateur production. (Note: The Petersham Choral Society played Ruddigore at the Petersham Town Hall 4–7 August 1908.)

His Majesty's Theatre, Melbourne followed, commencing 17 April with Gondoliers, followed on 3 May with Yeomen, Pirates from 15 May, The Mikado from 29 May, Pinafore from 19 June, Iolanthe from 3 July and Princess Ida from 17 July. Jacobs was conductor until 3 July, when Slapoffski returned to the podium.

His Majesty's Theatre, Brisbane was next, with Gondoliers 2–3 August, Yeomen, 4–6 August, and Pirates 7–9, Mikado 10–12, Pinafore and Trial by Jury 13–14, Iolanthe 16–18.

The Sydney season opened on 27 December with Gondoliers at the Theatre Royal, Yeomen on 8 January, Iolanthe 22 January, Pirates 5 February, Mikado 19 February, Princess Ida 12 March, Patience 19 March, and Pinafore with Trial by Jury 26 March.

The company returned to the Theatre Royal, Adelaide, for three weeks from 16 April to 6 May 1927, playing seven pieces, starting with The Mikado and ending with Patience. On top of her Gilbert and Sullivan duties, Everett produced the dance scenes for Lehar's Frasquita, produced by Charles Wenman for Williamson.

=== Gilbert and Sullivan 1931–32 ===
The tour began with Adelaide in March 1931, commencing with Gondoliers, Yeomen, and Pirates. Imported players from the Doyly Carte stable included Ivan Menzies, Gregory Stroud and Dorothy Gill. Other members were Marie Bremner, Leo Darnton, Bernard Manning, John Ralston, Alban Whitehead, Maisie Ramsay, and Mary Hotham, with Gustave Slapoffski conductor.

Everett returned to Williamson's in September 1932 to produce another G & S season at the Theatre Royal, this time including The Sorcerer and Ruddigore. In later years it would be said of Everett that she knew by heart every word, every note, gesture and action for all the G.& S. operettas except for Ruddigore, and its historic first professional staging (at Adelaide's Theatre Royal in 1927) was not by Everett but by James Hay. However, she made good the omission in Melbourne 1–8 October 1932

Sydney followed in September 1935 at the Theatre Royal; the cast included Ivan Menzies, Evelyn Gardiner, Gregory Stroud, Winifred Lawson, Richard Watson, Godfrey Stirling, and Bernard Manning.

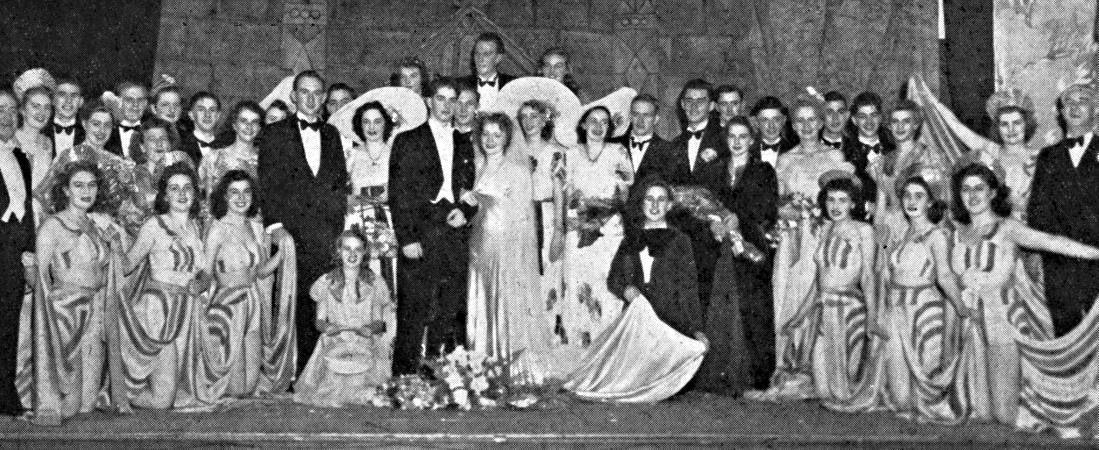
Minnie Everett Musical Comedy Company’s ‘Sally’ produced at the City Hall, Mentone in 1947

She produced another season in July 1940, again starring Ivan Menzies and Evelyn Gardiner with newcomers Viola Wilson and John Fullard. Everett then retired, but maintained an interest in amateur theatrics and in 1955 directed The Mikado for the Victorian Council of Adult Education. She still had what it takes.

She died barely a year later. She was fond of a smoke, so the story goes, and while lighting a cigarette at Prahran on 22 May 1956 she set her dressing gown on fire, and collapsed. Stephanie Guy was giving singing lessons to one Glenda McAlpin in the next room and heard the thud. They rushed into the room, smothered the flames with blankets and called an ambulance, but she died a fortnight later at The Alfred Hospital. Coroner Duggan found that death was accidental.

Her remains were cremated.

== Family ==
On 28 November 1895 Everett married William W Rice (c. 1869 – 30 July 1931), violist in J. C. Williamson's orchestra, son of conductor Watty Rice, and older brother of tennis player Horace Rice (1872–1950), and a decent cricketer himself. They had at least one daughter, who married V. C. Anderson.

The actress Lillian "Lily" Everett, of the Royal Comic Opera Company, was a sister. She married dentist Harry Morton Kilgour (1871 – 27 July 1941) of Kiama, New South Wales, founded the School of Arts Dramatic Club in that town, and had two daughters, Bettina "Betty" and Joan, then settled in New Zealand. In 1889 both Lily and Minnie Everett were members of the Royal Ballerinas.
