= Marie Bremner =

Australian soprano (1904–1980)

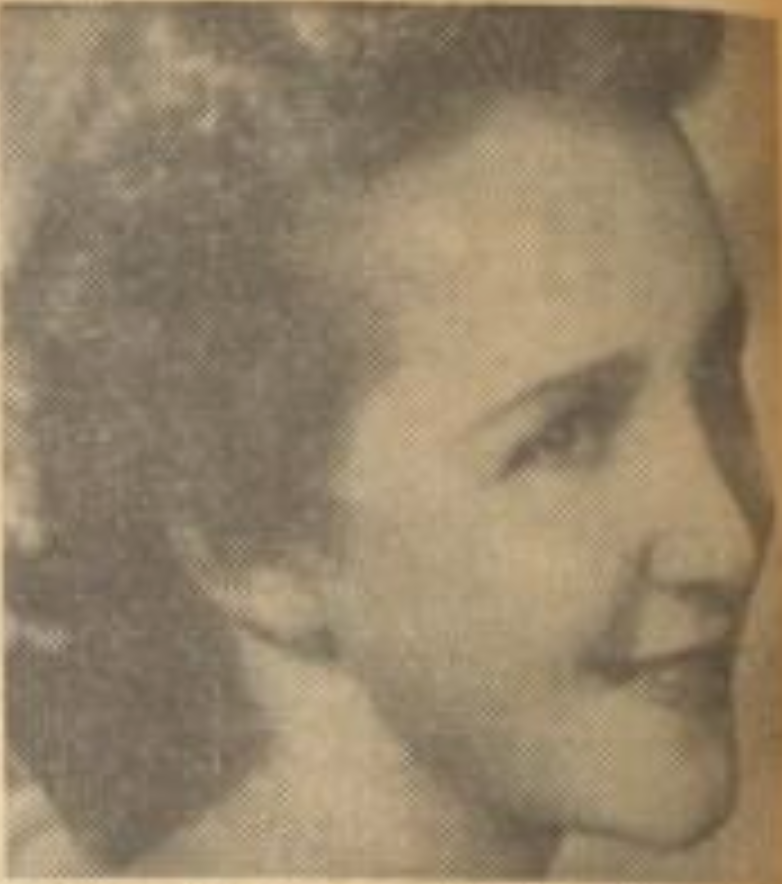
- Bremner in 1947

Background information
- Born: Marie Alice Bremner; 13 April 1904; Windsor, Victoria, Australia
- Died: 20 September 1980 (aged 76) Wentworth Falls, New South Wales, Australia
- Genres: Musical theatre, operetta, Gilbert and Sullivan
- Occupation: Singer
- Years active: 1920s–1940s
- Label: Columbia
- Spouse: Ewart Chapple (m. 1928)

Marie Alice Bremner (13 April 1904 – 20 September 1980) was an Australian soprano, remembered for performances in Gilbert and Sullivan operas. She became a favorite performer in musical comedy, first on stage, then revivals and variety shows on broadcast radio. She was popular with producers for her ability to take on key roles at a moment's notice and draw "rave" reviews. Her accompanist husband Ewart Chapple became a senior executive with the Australian Broadcasting Commission.

== Early life and career ==
Bremner was born in Windsor, Victoria, eldest daughter of Ernest J. L. Bremner (born 1879), prominent in the Australian Natives' Association, and Elizabeth Charlotte "Bessie" Bremner (died 1940) of "Arundel", Commercial Road, Melbourne. E. J. Bremner was born in New Zealand, and his mother was the first white child born in Nelson, New Zealand. Both her parents had good voices, and Marie started playing piano at age eight, then studied pianoforte at the Melbourne Conservatorium of Music, in 1921 winning the Dame Nellie Melba Scholarship for singing, which entitled her to two years' tuition at the Albert Street Conservatorium. The course placed special emphasis on European languages – Italian, French and German – so important to a performer of Grand Opera.

Bremner was one of the 25 Conservatorium students picked for the chorus of the original Melba-Williamson Grand Opera Company, and played The Lady of the Rose, The Street Singer, and Rose-Marie, then was taken out of the chorus to understudy Harriet Bennet, (Note: Frequently given other spellings, Bennet was born in Michigan but moved to California with her parents when quite young. She seems to have had a talent for mimicry, as she learned to speak in a credible English accent while working in London; her French accent was good enough to pass as French Canadian.) the lead soprano of Rose-Marie. That show closed, and she went on to understudy Wildflower, followed by Princess Charming and finally The Desert Song, whose lead soprano Virginia Perry (as Margot Bonvalet) left after 21 weeks and 175 performances, and Bremner was given the part, proving to be at least as good as her predecessor. In August 1927 Mascotte Ralston married Phillip Harris and left for America; Bremner stepped into her part.

The next major production for J. C. Williamson's was The New Moon, which opened at Her Majesty's, Sydney, on 4 January 1930, with Bremner and Lance Fairfax in the lead roles. Revivals of The Belle of New York and A Country Girl followed, before the company left for Melbourne's Theatre Royal. They played A Country Girl for twelve nights before The New Moon on 19 July. Illness prevented her appearing for a few nights in August, and Romola Hansen was flown in (an Australian "first") to take her place. Lilac Time, with Bremner, Hansen, and Lilian Crisp, with Ralston as Schubert, followed in September.

The Company played The New Moon and The Belle of New York in New Zealand in October and November 1930, but without Bremner, her place being taken by Romola Hansen. In December 1930, JCW announced the formation of a Gilbert and Sullivan company, with principal players Gregory Stroud, baritone; Ivan Menzies, comedian; Dorothy Gill, contralto; Leo Darnton, tenor; Bernard Manning, bass; Marie Bremner, soprano; and John Ralston, baritone. She led the cast in revivals of "The Belle of New York in January 1931, and Lilac Time from February to 6 March, when she returned to Melbourne to join the Gilbert and Sullivan (G.& S.) company.

The 1931–32 G.& S. season, produced by Minnie Everett with musical director Gustave Slapoffski, had its premiere, The Gondoliers at the Theatre Royal, Adelaide on 21 March 1931. Bremner played Gianetta, and other Australian newcomers to the genre included Mary Hotham, Maisie Ramsay (a Sun Aria winner) and Alban Whitehead, all Melba protégés. They took this production to Melbourne, opening 11 April, followed by Trial By Jury, then Iolanthe. Bremner had the name part in Patience, but was criticised for inattention. After four months' away from Sydney she was anxious to be back with her husband.

The 1932 Gilbert and Sullivan season opened at the Theatre Royal, Melbourne, on 24 September, with The Gondoliers, followed by Ruddigore; The Yeomen of the Guard, with Bremner as Elsie Maynard; Trial by Jury; The Mikado and Patience; finishing the year with Lilac Time and Dorothy. The Theatre Royal, Sydney followed in 1933 with The Gondoliers, The Yeomen of the Guard, Trial By Jury, and The Pirates of Penzance for which John Ralston was praised. Patience, The Mikado, in which Bremner played Yum Yum. and finally Iolanthe. Once again, Lilac Time closed the season; a core group which included Bremner, Ralston and Stroud, played the musical on radio 2FC.

The company sailed to South Africa under producer Minnie Everett, but without Bremner, who dropped out at the last moment; her place being taken by Elsie Griffin, wife of Ivan Menzies. John Leyland took the place of Ralston, who died the previous month. It is likely she preferred to stay at home with her husband, who by this time had been promoted to programme manager for New South Wales and Queensland.

Bremner appeared in several radio concert programmes; "The Belle of New York" with the A.B.C. (Sydney) Concert Orchestra, was one, but as the wife of an ABC executive (he became programme director for Sydney in 1932) she was not permitted to appear more than once a month. A year later she would appear as Rosalinde in "Waltz Time", adapted from A. P. Herbert's 1933 film, broadcast in July 1934.

A company, with Bremner the only Australian principal, took Rose-Marie to South Africa, under the English ballet mistress Ruby Morriss, JCW's second woman producer (Everett was the first). They had a successful season at His Majesty's Theatre, Johannesburg, Pietermaritzburg, Pretoria, Durban and Cape Town. Afterwards, Bremner and her husband Ewart Chapple holidayed in London, where she made a guest appearance on BBC Radio.

In a radical departure from musical comedy, on 18 July 1935 she appeared at Sydney's Conservatorium Hall in a recital of old English songs in conjunction with pianist Laurence Godfrey-Smith (1884–1973). The Desert Song was revived in August, with Bremner again as Margot, next as Sally Hook in Miss Hook of Holland, critics praising Bremner above all.

== Later years ==
Bremner had a serious surgical operation in Melbourne, January 1936, followed by six months' recuperation with her husband in the Blue Mountains. In July 1936 she rescued the Gipsy Princess company, taking the German star Maria Elsner's part when the mezzo-soprano was (reportedly) called away by Franz Lehár. In August Bremner and Strella Wilson, both back on stage after a long break, took the two female leads in Waltzes from Vienna, another biographic musical about Johann Strauss, while the humorist Cecil Kellaway "stole" the show.

In the years 1936–38 Bremner appeared in various radio adaptations radio adaptations of popular musicals — Dorothy, The Student Prince. and The Belle of New York, The Country Girl, and The Lilac Domino. Bremner appeared in broadcast operettas 1937 included Alfred Hill's A Moorish Maid, The Gay Deceivers by Muriel Lesley and D. Bowes-Kelly; The Rebel Prince; "Love Wins Through" by Howard Ellis Carr, Adrian Ross and C. B. Fernald; Plays produced in Perth May–July 1937 included The Belle of New York, The Duchess of Dantzic, Véronique, La Poupée, La Lune Bleu by Paul Furniss and Horace Keats, and Floradora. While in Perth she sang Awake, Beloved by Yehunda or Yahunda, a West Australian. In Brisbane, where she played radio adaptations of Lionel Monckton's The Cingalee, and The Student Prince, substituting for Gladys Moncrieff. Musicals broadcast in 1938 were Strauss's Gipsy Baron and The Daughter of the Dragon by Frederick Whaite, Muriel Leslie and D. Bowes-Kelly, otherwise she had only variety shows and recitals. She starred in The Country Girl in May 1941

One of her last large stage concerts was in March 1937 when she was a featured vocalist at an A.W.A.-sponsored concert at the Sydney Town Hall with a full symphony orchestra under François Stempinski and four pianos — the players being Isador Goodman, Frank Hutchens, Alexander Sverjensky and Frederick Hyde.

A rare re-appearance of Bremner in a stage musical was a revival, at Her Majesty's Theatre, Melbourne, on 18 February 1939 of A Waltz Dream with Americans Bernice Claire, Jack Arthur and Melton Moore. She returned to the boards in 1941 as an emergency replacement for Helen Gilliland, with the JCW revue Funny Side Up with Clem Dawe and Dick Bentley. When Viola Wilson married Frank Tait she played Elsie Maynard in The Yeomen of the Guard in August 1941 and in September Yum Yum, in a well-received Mikado starring Ivan Menzies, Bernard Manning, Evelyn Gardiner and John Fullard, both as a last-minute replacement. Bremner stayed with JCW's Musical Comedy Company to play the lead in a dull Kissing Time, then returned to radio concerts. During WWII she assisted at many patriotic and charitable concerts

She returned to Gilbert and Sullivan in 1944 as the name part in Patience May Rosebud in Ruddigore, Yum Yum in The Mikado Her radio work continued through the 1940s, mostly for the ABC but occasionally for the Macquarie Network, on their weekly Musical Comedy Theatre.

Her husband, Ewart Chapple, was made the ABC's acting State manager for Western Australia in September 1947, and appointed to the position in December. Bremner was soon active in Perth's arts community. After five years in the west, they left for Europe on an extended holiday, Ewart's position being taken by Basil Kirke, and on their return eleven months later, Chapple was appointed State manager for Victoria.

She died at Wentworth Falls, New South Wales

== Other interests ==
Bremner was fond of outdoor sports, swimming, golf, tennis, riding and folk songs.

Like her hero and mentor, Dame Nellie Melba, Bremner gave moral and practical assistance to up-and-coming vocalists:

- She helped Jean Duncan, acting as her chaperone when otherwise her parents would have prevented her from travelling interstate with the Company.
- In 1936 she did much to further the career of baritone Robert Nicholson, who was born in Bexley on 13 September 1906 and in 1929 won a scholarship to the Melbourne University Conservatorium, and was influenced by Richard Crooks to study overseas. He appeared in a Delius quartet at Carnegie Hall in 1938, received favorable mentions in 1944 and was heard a little later by Sir Thomas Beecham at the Metropolitan Opera House, but nothing has been found of his later history; the Nicholson-Dawson collection of vocal scores, held by the NLA, was named for the Nicholson brothers (Robert and John) and for Peter Dawson.
- In 1939 she supported fundraising for Queensland pianist Katharine Anscombe, who won a scholarship to the Royal College of Music.
- From 1946 to 1947 she contributed, by way of concerts, to a testimonial fund for John Probyn, a bass-baritone from Arncliffe, New South Wales. Probyn joined Sadler's Wells Opera company and married fellow-singer Marjorie Shires, later known as Marjorie Probyn-Lee (1920–2012).
- Other aspiring Australian artists she showcased were young songwriter Robyn Teakle, poet/playwright John Wheeler, and painter Ella Fry.

While in Perth, she coached an amateur theatre group playing operetta.

== Recordings ==
- "If I'm Dreaming" (from Sally), and "Coo" (A Country Girl) on Columbia
- "Down in the Forest" and "April Morn" for Columbia

== Personal ==
Bremner married piano accompanist (James Richard) Ewart Chapple (1901–1995) on 2 June 1928. They had no children. Chapple was well known as the resident accompanist of radio station 2FC, later became manager for Victoria of the ABC.

Qantas publicity manager Ernest Bennett-Bremner was her brother. He married women's cricketer and socialite Alix Lamb in 1935; they divorced and he married Mervyn Beaver (widow of Harold C. Beaver) née Pitt, on 11 July 1946. He had an interest in amateur theatre and children's charities.

The singer Greta Constance Bremner was her younger sister. She married pilot C. W. A. Scott on 16 September 1936; they divorced on 8 October 1940 and he died 15 April 1946.
