= John Fullard =

Welsh operatic tenor (1907–1973)

David John Fullard (25 October 1907 – 25 September 1973) was a Welsh tenor singer with the Covent Garden Opera company, who appeared in BBC concerts and on several recordings. He had a considerable career playing Gilbert and Sullivan roles (of which he had no previous experience) in Australia between 1940 and 1955.

== History ==
Fullard was born in Brecon, Wales. According to one report, he was born a tenor; his voice never broke, and he was rejected from the cathedral choir, who only wanted boy sopranos.

In grand opera he played David in Die Meistersinger, Adolfo in Puccini's Gianni Schicchi and Luigi in Il tabarro, Fenton in Verdi's Falstaff, and the title role in Gounod's Faust. He sang Handel's Judas Maccabaeus with Sir Henry Wood's BBC Symphony Orchestra. He created Sir Lavaine in Rutland Boughton's The Lily Maid and the Squire in George Lloyd's second opera, The Serf. He might have sung the title role in Handel's Samson for Sir Henry Wood but for the advent of World War II.

He sang in The Canterbury Pilgrims after being selected for the role by the composer, George Dyson.

In April 1939 at Dartington Hall, Devon, Fullard married soprano Anne (or Helen) Coleman, who had been a fellow-student at the Royal Academy of Music. With the outbreak of war, she found secretarial work at the Department of Agriculture, while he was employed as an ambulance driver. Late that year Fullard was contracted by J. C. Williamson's as leading man for their 1940 Gilbert and Sullivan season in Australia, along with Ivan Menzies and Gregory Stroud, both of whom had played in that country several times before. It would also be Fullard's first appearance in G.& S.

=== Australia ===
The Gondoliers opened at the Theatre Royal, Sydney on 16 March 1940, and was well received, Fullard being called back for two encores of "Take a Pair of Sparkling Eyes", a song he learned to sing in the blackouts. The Yeomen of the Guard followed, then Iolanthe, The Mikado, Patience and Princess Ida. A similar program then followed at His Majesty's Theatre, Melbourne. In each review he was praised for his voice, described as pure and light, ideal for G.& S. The season was followed in February and March 1942 with Lilac Time, with Fullard playing Schubert alongside Viola Wilson as Lilli Veit.

In 1940 the Fullards were near neighbours to Evelyn Gardiner and her husband, and fellow members of the Garden Club. On 7 September 1942 he enlisted with the Royal Australian Naval Volunteer Reserve and appointed sub-lieutenant. He was promoted lieutenant in January 1943. In 1942 their residence was Crick Avenue, Darlinghurst; in 1948 "Macleay Regis" (apartments), Potts Point. He appeared, Navy duties permitting, on the Macquarie Radio Network for Colgate Palmolive from September 1942 to January 1949 in the weekly programmes "Calling the Stars" and the "Cashmere Bouquet Show". He reprised his role in The Canterbury Pilgrims on ABC radio in June 1946.

Fullard and his wife Helen (Note: In most reports she was named Helen, but Navy records had her name, in his handwriting, as Anne Dorothy Margaret.) Dorothy Margaret Fullard, née Coleman (born c. 1917), divorced in February 1948 after she left him for mutual friend Emil Landau in Hong Kong. He then made a "farewell tour" series of concerts, which included the Crystal Theatre, Broken Hill,

He returned to Britain in 1949 but was soon back in Australia, arriving in Fremantle aboard the Coptic in August 1950 and by plane to Sydney; he married Mrs Barbara Levy, née Smart, of Potts Point on 19 September, and rejoined J.C.W.'s Gilbert and Sullivan Company in October.

Fullard was active in promoting opera and performance of the classical repertoire. In 1945 he gave a concert in Maryborough, Queensland in support of that town's Philharmonic Society, which had experienced a downturn in numbers. In later years, though still an active performer, he served as adjudicator at the Sun Aria Contest and the Sydney Eisteddfod.

Sometime around 1955 he returned to England, where he died some twenty years later.

== See also ==
Other tenors who played G.& S. and Schubert in Lilac Time for JCW:

- Leo Darnton 1926–28 season
- John Ralston Lilac Time in 1924, G.& S. in 1933
