= Ethel Morrison =

New Zealand contralto singer (c. 1880 – 1951)

Ethel Morrison (c. 1880 – 11 May 1951), nicknamed "Morry" or "Molly" and described as a "large lady with a large voice", was a contralto singer from New Zealand who began her career in Gilbert and Sullivan operas and Edwardian musical comedies in England. She later acted mostly in Australia and was noted for her performances in domineering roles.

== History ==
Morrison was born in Wellington, New Zealand. She had hopes for a career on the concert stage, and studied singing at the Royal Academy of Music.

=== D'Oyly Carte years ===
Morrison joined the D'Oyly Carte Opera Company in 1906 performing in the Gilbert and Sullivan operas, initially in the chorus, and her first named role on stage was Inez in The Gondoliers. As Louie René's understudy, she had the opportunity, on occasion, to play Lady Jane in Patience, the Queen of the Fairies in Iolanthe, and Dame Carruthers in The Yeomen of the Guard. At the end of the London season she toured with D'Oyly Carte, playing Inez and understudying the leading contralto roles. In December 1907 Morrison was promoted to playing the leading contralto roles: Little Buttercup in H.M.S. Pinafore, Ruth in The Pirates of Penzance, Lady Blanche in Princess Ida, Katisha in The Mikado, and the Duchess in The Gondoliers, as well as the abovementioned parts in Patience, Iolanthe, and Yeomen.

The company returned to the Savoy Theatre in April 1908 for the London repertory season, and Morrison was relegated to her previous role as understudy, occasionally going on for René as Buttercup and Katisha, and playing Mrs. Jones in the one-act companion piece A Welsh Sunset. In October 1908, again on tour with the company, Morrison was the leading contralto. She left the company in September 1909 to appear at the Savoy in the world premiere of W. S. Gilbert's Fallen Fairies on 15 December 1909, creating the part of Locrine. Fallen Fairies closed in January 1910.

Morrison next appeared at the Apollo Theatre as Lady Birkenhead in an Edwardian musical comedy, The Islander (April–August 1910), and then played the small role of Laska in The Chocolate Soldier at the Lyric Theatre (September 1910). She rejoined the D'Oyly Carte on tour as an emergency replacement for René in October 1910 in her accustomed roles in Iolanthe, Mikado, Yeomen, Gondoliers, and others. After this, she left the company and appeared in the pantomime Our Little Cinderella at the Playhouse Theatre from December 1910 to January 1911, followed by a musicalised version of Strauss's Die Fledermaus called Nightbirds at the Lyric from December 1911 to May 1912, the musical The Girl in the Taxi, also at the Lyric, opening in September 1912, and a play called Within the Law at the Haymarket Theatre, opening in May 1913.

=== Australia ===
She was then recruited by J. C. Williamson to join his opera company. She played the Duchess of Plaza-Toro in The Gondoliers at Her Majesty's Theatre, Melbourne from 27 June 1914, and was praised for her Katisha in The Mikado and Dame Carruthers in The Yeomen of the Guard. She was praised for her Lady Jane in Patience at Her Majesty's Theatre, Melbourne in August 1914, when audience numbers were depleted by the War. She made an "imposing and effective Duchess of Plaza Toro" in The Gondoliers at His Majesty's Theatre, Perth in May 1915. and a "stately and amusing" mother in The Chocolate Soldier at His Majesty's Theatre, Brisbane in July 1915. She was in the Australian premiere of Tonight's the Night at Her Majesty's, Melbourne, on 8 July 1916, together with Dorothy Brunton, Connie Ediss and Alfred Frith, directed by Harry B. Burcher with choreography by Minnie Hooper.

In 1917, she appeared in The Marriage of Kitty, Penelope, Mary Goes First and A Pair of Silk Stockings with Marie Tempest's company. She appeared in a brief revival of The Silent Witness at the Theatre Royal, Melbourne at Muriel Starr's farewell appearance in March 1920, notable for the appearance of Frank Harvey and J. B. Atholwood. She played in Harbach and Hirsch's Mary from its premiere at the Theatre Royal, Adelaide 23 September 1922 to 22 August 1923 at Her Majesty's Theatre, Sydney, then left for a holiday in London via America aboard SS Wanganui on 20 September 1923. She was reckoned "easily one of the most popular artistes ... to ever visit Australia".

=== Broadway ===
In late 1923 and January 1924 Morrison was in New York City appearing on Broadway in a revue, The Topics of 1923, with Frank Greene. She was informed that her husband had died in England around this time, and so on 1 March she sailed on the Olympic to London to be with her ten-year-old daughter, who was at school there. Later that year she returned to Broadway.

In 1927 she had a minor part in the musical comedy Maritza in New York as a marquise who has a facelift performed on her by beauty specialists, and henceforth needs to employ a servant whose job is to express emotions for her.

=== Back in Australia ===
In May 1930, she returned to Australia with Edith Taliaferro by the steamer Sonoma under contract to J. C. Williamson's, playing Rachel Crothers' Let Us Be Gay at the Criterion Theatre, Sydney. Morrison (as Mrs Boucicault) and Reginald Dane were praised for their playing in the comedy.

Let Us Be Gay was followed in June 1930 by The Garden of Eden, Avery Hopwood's adaptation of Rudolf Bernauer's Der Garten Eden, with Morrison playing the Baroness, then in July in the controversial Little Accident, then The Road to Romance (originally The Road to Rome) by R. E. Sherwood, at the Comedy Theatre. The plays were also performed at the King's Theatre, Melbourne and the Comedy Theatre, Melbourne. In December 1930 Taliaferro returned to America and Morrison to Sydney, where she played in Neil F. Grant's Possessions, at the "Cri".

In January 1931, she played the title role of St John Ervine's The First Mrs Fraser, created by Marie Tempest, followed in January 1931 with a revival of Barrie's Mary Rose, as Mrs Morland, in February. The cast then returned to Sydney to open in The First Mrs Fraser in March followed in May with Hastings Turner's comedy, The Spot on the Sun, co-starring with Ada Reeve. In June they took The First Mrs Fraser and Let Us Be Gay to her home town Wellington, New Zealand, followed by the Theatre Royal, Adelaide in August. The comedy A Warm Corner followed, Morrison playing Adela Corner who, like TV's Hyacinth Bucket, has visions of a high society future for herself and Charles Corner, her corn-plaster merchant husband. Noël Coward's Hay Fever followed for four nights at the end of August and the company moved to Melbourne with A Warm Corner, which ran for five weeks before moving to Sydney in October in Hay Fever and As Husbands Go, and in December 1931 Let Us Be Gay. The company returned to Melbourne's King's Theatre with As Husbands Go which on 20 February 1932 they took to His Majesty's Theatre, Brisbane, followed by Let Us Be Gay, and The First Mrs Fraser, which on 12 or 14 March was Morrison's last appearance in Australia for the time being, leaving from Sydney by the Makura on 17 March.

She returned to Australia by the Makura on 20 October 1934, joining Madge Elliott and Cyril Ritchard, for the Otto Harbach and Jerome Kern musical Roberta at His Majesty's Theatre, Melbourne, opening on 22 December 1934; High Jinks, and Our Miss Gibbs. Its Sydney season opened at Her Majesty's in March 1935. Her performance was praised.

In 1936, she played in Emlyn Williams' Night Must Fall, in Brisbane, Sydney and Melbourne; remembered fondly years later. Morrison then joined a four-month tour of New Zealand with J. C. Williamson's, returning in August to play in Yes Madam, starring Charles Heslop. In November, she left on the ship Orion for London, where she lived in Notting Hill.

In 1947, she returned to New Zealand, where she holidayed with her family for six months then returned to Sydney, where she died on 11 May 1951.
