= Her Majesty's Theatre (disambiguation) =

Her Majesty's Theatre usually refers to the former name of His Majesty's Theatre, in London from 1952 until 2023.

It may also refer to:

- Her Majesty's Theatre, Adelaide, South Australia
- Her Majesty's Theatre, Ballarat, Victoria, Australia
- Her Majesty's Theatre, Brisbane, Queensland, Australia, 1888–1983
- Her Majesty's Theatre, Carlisle, Cumbria, England, 1905–1963
- Her Majesty's Theatre, Melbourne, Victoria, Australia, since 1886
- Her Majesty's Theatre, Montreal, Quebec, Canada, 1898–1963
- Her Majesty's Theatre, Sydney, New South Wales, Australia, three different theatres

== See also ==
- His Majesty's Theatre (disambiguation)
