= John Crook (conductor) =

English conductor and composer (1847–1922)

John Francis Crook (1847 – 10 November 1922) was an English conductor who composed music for comic opera and musicals in the late 18th- and early 19th-centuries.

Crook was born in Marylebone, London, and had a privileged musical education, as protégé of an aunt and uncle, the well-known artistes Madame De Belleville and violinist Antonio James Oury. At Norwich he was taught harmony and counterpoint by one James Hill, and was appointed organist to St John's Catholic Chapel. (Note: Perhaps St. John's Catholic Chapel, Salford)

After completing his studies at the Royal Academy of Music, London, he joined a grand opera company as violinist, and was soon promoted to chorus master and pianist at rehearsals.

He succeeded both Alfred Cellier (1871 to 1875) and Frederic Stanislaus (Note: Frederic or Frederick Stanislaus (27 Dec 1844 – 22 Nov 1891) was born Stanislaus Smith, composed the operetta The Lancashire Witches (1879) and contributed to The Palace of Pearl (1886).) as conductor and musical director at the Prince's Theatre, Manchester; they were collectively known as the "Manchester Three". It was here he wrote The King's Dragoons. He wrote the comic opera Merry Mignon and the musical comedy Larks.

His stars rose with the fashion for French operettas, and was kept busy conducting La fille de Madame Angot and other Farnie adaptations, among which was a reworking of Planquette's Les Voltigeurs de la 32ème into The Old Guard (1887), with Arthur Roberts, Joseph Tapley, Alec Marsh, Marion Mackenzie and Fanny Wentworth at the Avenue Theatre in 1887. He conducted Edmond Audran's Indiana and La Mascotte at the Avenue Theatre. He reworked Chassaigne's Les Noces Improvisees as Nadgy in 1888 and Wenzel's Les Dragons de la Reine as The Young Recruit (1892).

He conducted Madame Favart, Falks, Giroflé-Girofla, Tito Mattei's comic opera La Prima Donna, and many others.

During the years 1890–1893 Crook was director for Sir Augustus Harris at Drury Lane: grand opera, pantomime, and melodrama. He conducted Carmen for two seasons, one with Mdlle Farini in the name part, the other with Agnes Janson.

His writing for the stage includes, The Lady Slavey at the Avenue Theatre The New Barmaid (also billed as The Lady Barmaid), The County Councillor at the Duke of York's Theatre, Jaunty Jane Shore (a parody of The Tragedy of Jane Shore) at The Strand, The Kodak, or King Kodak, at Terry's, Venus, Orpheus, Black and White, House of Lords, the "gloriously tuneful" Peter Pan, and several musical comedies composed for Arthur Roberts: Lancelot the Lovely, Don Quixote, Claude Duval, and Robinson Crusoe.

He wrote new scores for Lancelot the Lovely, starring Arthur Roberts and Field of the Cloth of Gold.

In August 1900 George Musgrove sailed for Australia with an English company for a six-week season of grand opera, with Crook as one conductor, Gustave Slapoffski, already in Melbourne, as the other. Their first performance in Australia was Il Trovatore at Musgrave's newly acquired and refurbished Princess Theatre, on Saturday, 13 October 1900, and was hailed by critics.

Perhaps his most popular composition was the song "Angels of Heaven Defend Thee", sung by Joseph Tapley in The Scarlet Feather. His "Laughing Song" and "Military Song and Chorus" were from the same show. He returned to England in October 1901.

Back in London, he wrote The Coster's Serenade for Albert Chevalier

== Personal ==
Crook married Alice Julia Burville; they had a home at 221 Norwood Road, Norwood.
