= Viola Wilson =

Scottish singer (1911–2002)

Viola Wilson AM (1 November 1911 – 6 February 2002) was a Scottish singer, the leading soprano for the D'Oyly Carte Opera Company in Britain (1938–1939) and then J. C. Williamson's Gilbert and Sullivan company in Australia during World War II. She married the widowed theatre businessman Frank S. Tait, later Sir Frank.

== Early life and career ==
Wilson was born Violet Wilson Hogg in Pressburg, Austria/Hungary, youngest daughter of Violet Hogg (née Wilson) and Gavin Hogg of Paisley, Scotland. She trained as a pianist, then studied singing at the Scottish National Academy of Music.

In the 1930s she joined the Carl Rosa Opera Company in 1935, touring Britain and South Africa. She played six principal soprano roles in Gilbert and Sullivan's comic operas (G&S) with the D'Oyly Carte Opera Company in London from 1938 to 1939, where she first adopted her maternal grandfather's name, Wilson, and on the company's visit to Broadway in early 1939.

== J. C. Williamson's ==
In 1940 she was brought out to Australia by J. C. Williamson's as leading soprano for their G&S company. They opened on 16 March 1940 at the Theatre Royal, Sydney with The Gondoliers, in which Wilson's performance (as Casilda) in the duet "There Was a Time" was praised. The Yeomen of the Guard (as Elsie) followed, then Iolanthe (as Phyllis), The Mikado (Yum Yum), then the title roles in Patience and Princess Ida. A similar program then followed at His Majesty's Theatre, Melbourne, running for 22 weeks, an Australian record. Frank Tait, managing director of J. C. Williamson's, announced that the company would be kept together for the duration of the war, though it might mean departing from the G&S repertoire to play such works as Balfe's opera The Bohemian Girl, Wallace's Maritana and the operetta Lilac Time.

They left for New Zealand on 26 December, for a four-month tour. In April 1941, while at Dunedin on the last leg of their tour, Wilson and Tait announced their engagement, their wedding set for 16 August. The company returned to Australia, playing at His Majesty's Theatre, Brisbane from 24 April to 24 May. Many playgoers sported tartan accessories on the final night as a compliment to Wilson. Adelaide followed on 31 May and Perth from 28 June, and the company was back in Melbourne playing The Gondoliers from 2 August. Wilson was playing Casilda on the eve of her marriage The wedding was informal, with all the G&S company taking part. Evelyn Gardiner's husband Lieut.-Col. Richard Lister York gave the bride away, as her father could not make the trip. Wilson's friend Sara Gregory was bridesmaid, and her singing teacher Francesca Duret sang Grieg's "I Love Thee" during the signing of the register. Both husband and wife made speeches at the reception, held at their home on Hopetoun Road, Toorak, Victoria. Marie Bremner took Wilson's place in the company while the couple was on their brief honeymoon in Brisbane, the Gold Coast in Queensland and Sydney.

Still billed as "Viola Wilson", she was back with the company in Melbourne for a week from 6 September, playing Princess Ida. Then followed H.M.S. Pinafore (as Josephine), Ruddigore (as Rose Maybud), Mikado, The Sorcerer (as Aline), and Lilac Time. Sydney followed with a double bill of The Pirates of Penzance (as Mabel) and Trial by Jury (as Angelina) followed by Yeomen and others. In April 1942 the company played Strauss's operetta Nightbirds, with Wilson as Adele. The Gondoliers followed, with Wilson again playing Casilda, and Iolanthe in June, though Wilson suffered from colds that season. In February 1943 the company were back in Melbourne with the promised Lilac Time with Wilson as Lilli. That January a G&S opera, The Gondoliers, was broadcast for the first time in Australia, live and in full, though some dialogue was excised, with broadcasts of Pirates and Iolanthe in February. The principal performers were Ivan Menzies, Wilson, Evelyn Gardiner and Bernard Manning.

== Children and later years ==
For three years after this Wilson's appearances on stage were sporadic; on 31 May 1943 she gave birth to a daughter Isla Frances Tait, who was named for Wilson's sister. When Gladys Moncrieff was unable to appear at that year's Carols by Candlelight, due to commitments with the troops in New Guinea, Wilson volunteered. She also participated in patriotic and charitable functions, appearing with Gracie Fields at a concert for soldiers at Puckapunyal. A second daughter, Viola Anne, was born on 20 December 1944.

She returned to the stage in June 1946 as Maria in Ivor Novello's The Dancing Years, to good but not glowing reviews. After this, she retired from Willilamson's,although she continued to serve for a time as an artistic director with the company. In 1947 Mr and Mrs Tait made a four-month visit to Scotland, leaving their two little daughters in Melbourne. A third daughter, Sally, was born 16 July 1949.

Later activities include many years' adjudicating at finals of the £1,000 Mobil Quest talent show, whose winner in 1950 was Joan Sutherland. She was also on the judging panel for the inaugural Miss Australia Quest in 1954. In 1971 she published her biography of the Tait brothers and the Williamson-Tait partnership, which also covers details of her own life and career. She was appointed a Member of the Order of Australia in the 1990 Australia Day Honours for service to the performing arts. She was instrumental in establishing the Tait Memorial Trust in 1992 and in founding the Performing Arts Museum in Melbourne.

Tait died on 6 February 2002. She left her large collection of theatrical memorabilia to the Victorian Arts Centre.

== Publications ==
- Tait, Viola (1971). A Family of Brothers: the Taits and J.C. Williamson: a theatre history. Heinemann. pp. 303 (illustrated). ISBN 0855610115.
- Tait, Viola (2001). Dames, Principal Boys . . . and All That: a history of pantomime in Australia. Macmillan. pp. 239 (illustrated). ISBN 187683224X.

== See also ==
- Frank S. Tait#Family includes his second family with Viola Tait.
