= His Majesty's Theatre =

His Majesty's Theatre may refer to:

- Her Majesty's Theatre, Brisbane, Australia, known as His Majesty's Theatre 1901–1952, demolished 1983
- His Majesty's Theatre, London, England, known as Her Majesty's Theatre 1952–2023
- His Majesty's Theatre, Aberdeen, Scotland
- His Majesty's Theatre, Melbourne, Australia
- His Majesty's Theatre, Perth, Australia

== See also ==
- Her Majesty's Theatre (disambiguation)
