= Lance Fairfax =

Singer and actor from New Zealand

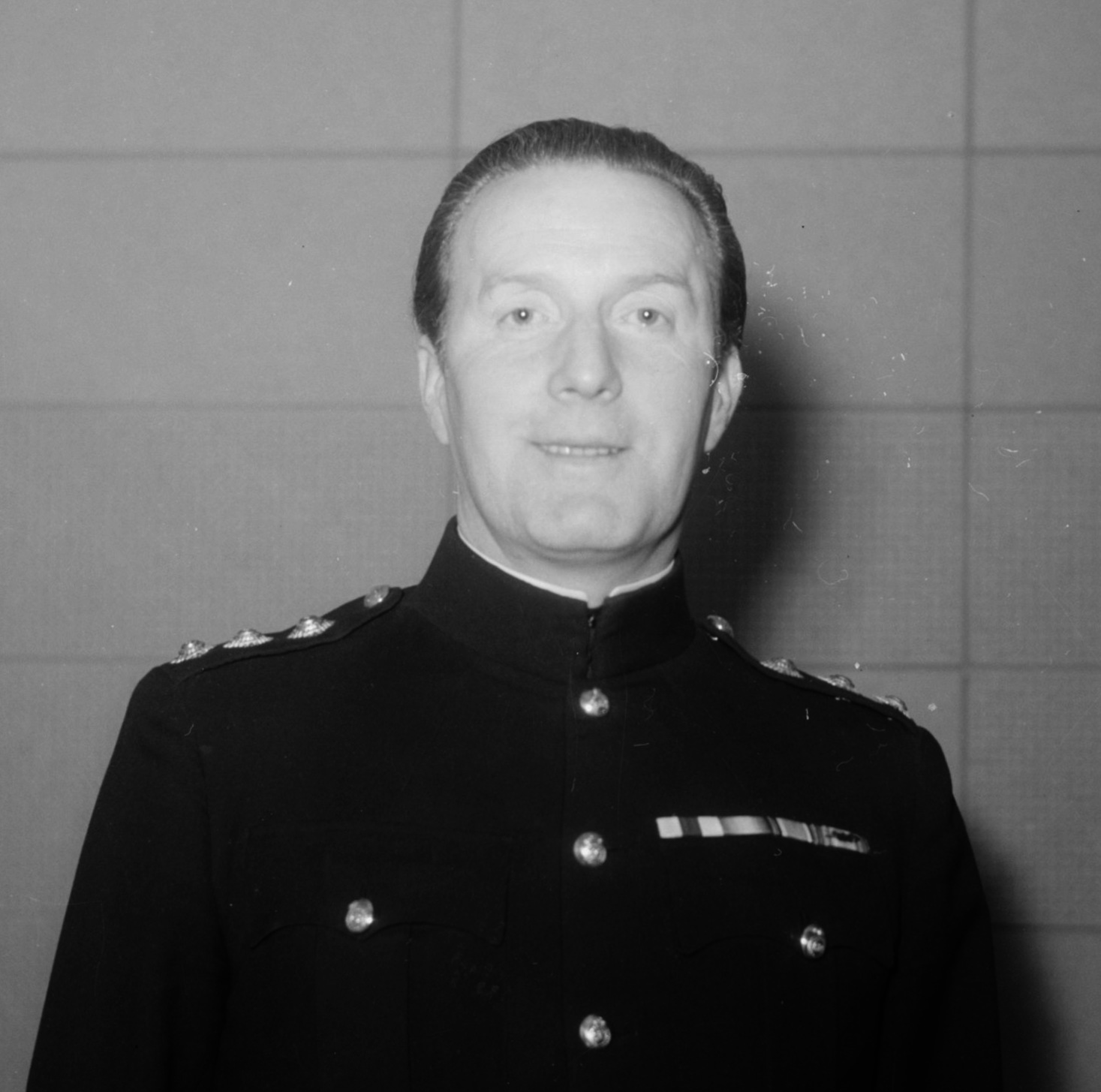
Lance Fairfax in 1941.

Lance Fairfax (12 April 1894 – January 1974) was a singer and actor from New Zealand, classed as a light baritone, who had a substantial career in Australia.

== History ==
Fairfax was born Lancelot [Launcelot?] Fairfax Jones in Wellington, New Zealand on 12 April 1894. After leaving school he began studying for qualification as a barrister, working in the office of Sir John Findlay, KC, but the Great War intervened, and he enlisted with the New Zealand Expeditionary Force.

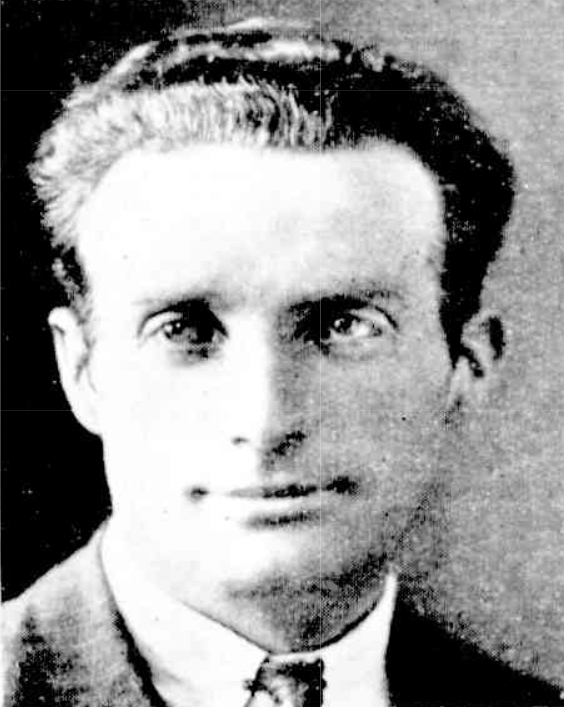
Lance Fairfax in 1926

He served with the Wellington Regiment (elsewhere cited as Canterbury Regiment), receiving an MC; in 1916 promoted to lieutenant, 9th regiment (Hawke's Bay), then at war's end, when the New Zealand Division moved into Cologne, he joined H. P. "Pat" Hanna's No. 1 Entertainment Unit. He studied singing in London with George Uttley and Sir George Power.

Returning home in 1919, Hanna founded a revue company of 21 New Zealand ex-servicemen, which in 1920 appeared at Sydney's Theatre Royal, billed as the "Famous Digger Pierrots" (Note: "Diggers" was a well-known synonym for Australian and New Zealand soldiers.) for J. C. Williamson's. By September 1920 the "Digger Pierrots" had become the "Famous Diggers", and numbered eleven:

G. P. Hanna (Otago Regt), Lance Fairfax, Sydney Exton (Wellington Regt), aka S. Laslett Exton, Roy Simpson (Auckland Regt), Norman French (Div. Sig.), George Long (5th Div. AIF), Chris Kilner (Anzac Mounted, AIF), Johnny Marks (5th Div., A.I.F.), Will Crawford (Wellington Regt), Victor Cross (NZ Field Artillery Brigade) and Charles Stewart (Wellington Regt).

They finished their Australian tour at the Arcadia Theatre on the St Kilda esplanade, when their members included Hanna, Fairfax, Exton, Simpson, French, Long, Kilner, Marks, Crawford, Cross, and Stewart, also Clarice Norman and Ethel Hartley. Fairfax left the group sometime after January 1921, joining The Masqueraders for a season in New Zealand followed by vaudeville at Rickards' Tivoli Theatre.

The "Famous Diggers" in February 1922 included Hanna, Exton, Simpson, Kilner and Marks mentioned above, also Clyde Fields, Myrtle Wedgwood, Bobbie Pearce, Norman French, Jessie Meadows, and Ada Pescud. The group survived to around 1930.

In 1924 Fairfax appeared in concert with Miss Vida Castles, (Note: Vida's birth name has not been found but was possibly sister of Florence Carter, who married Harold David James Clinton in 1911. Castles was in Perth, September 1920, playing in Bing Boys on Broadway and The English Pierrots in Melbourne, December 1920, when her child impersonations were praised. Nothing further has been found until October 1923, when she was in Brisbane, accompanied by Fairfax.) as the "Lance Fairfax Duo". It is likely she was by this time married to Fairfax.

By 1926 Fairfax had joined J. C. Williamson's Musical Comedy Company, playing in Minnie Everett's production of The Gondoliers in Melbourne as Giuseppe, to some success. He should have played Sir Richard Cholmondeley in The Yeomen of the Guard but was laid low by influenza, and Albert Tarrant had to step in at short notice. Fairfax played Samuel in The Pirates of Penzance, when both he and Bernard Manning were criticised for over-playing their parts. He played Pish Tush in The Mikado and Strephon in Iolanthe. Fairfax and Leo Darnton played Hilarion's companions in Princess Ida.

After the Gilbert and Sullivan season he played The Desert Song, as "The Red Shadow", a part he would play over and over, and for which, with his mild-mannered alter ego Pierre Birabeau, he is best remembered.

In July and August 1928 he played Bill Smith in Hit the Deck, to excellent reviews and full houses.

In 1930 he played The New Moon as Robert Misson, opposite Marie Bremner, on occasion replaced by Sidney Burchall. Fairfax left the New Moon company to play the rebel chief Baldassaré in The Maid of the Mountains opposite Gladys Moncrieff. By the close of that season Fairfax's contract with JCW had expired He left aboard SS Moreton Bay for London, where a chance encounter led to his being managed by Sir Alfred Butt.

He played the title character in the 1931 film of the musical The Beggar Student.

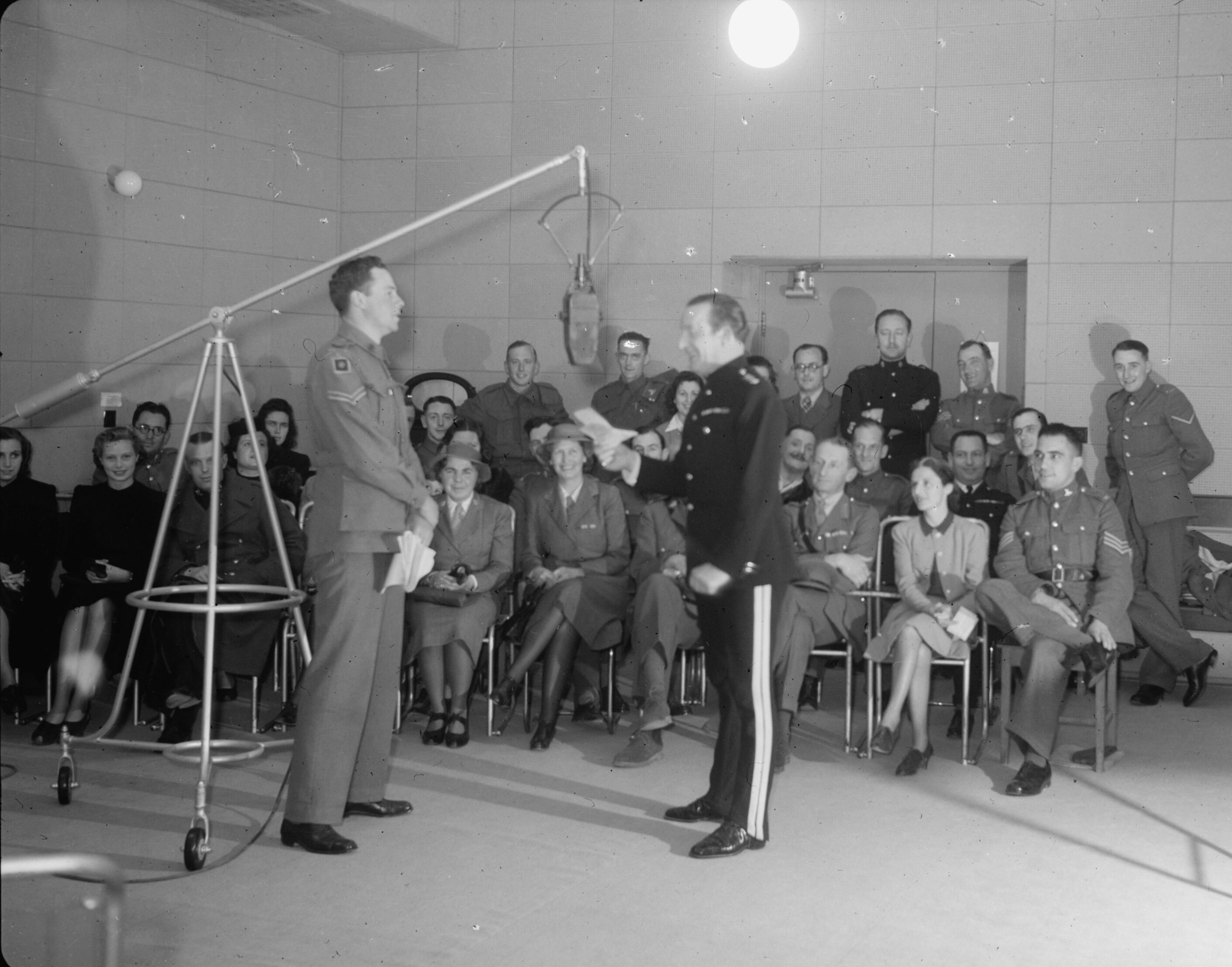
Musical program for soldiers broadcast under the direction of Lance Fairfax at Palestine Broadcasting Service Studios in 1941.

He played Escamillo in the 1931 film Carmen by Elstree Studios, much of which was filmed in Spain

In 1940 he enlisted with the British Army, serving as lieutenant-colonel in charge of an entertainment unit.

== Films ==
- The Beggar Student (1931) as Carl Romaine
- Carmen (1931) as Escamillo

== Family ==
Fairfax married Vida sometime around 1922; they had two children: violinist Bryan Fairfax (8 February 1925 – 11 January 2014), and Diana Vida Jean Fairfax (19 December 1927 – 28 January 2019), who appeared in the film Between Five and Seven.
