= Minnie Hooper =

- Born: Fanny Emily Mary Hooper; 1876; Carlton, Victoria, Australia
- Died: 1964 (aged 87-88)
- Occupations: Dance instructor, ballet mistress

Minnie Hooper (born as Fanny Emily Mary Hooper; 1876 – 1964) was an Australian dance instructor and ballet mistress. She has been credited, with Jennie Brenan and Minnie Everett, with maintaining the high standard of Australian dance and ballet in the 1920s, between the reigns of Emilia Pasta and Anna Pavlova.

She had a long series of contracts with theatrical management company J. C. Williamson's and conducted classes at her dance studio on Pitt Street, Sydney.

== Biography ==
=== Early life ===
Hooper was born in Carlton, Victoria, third daughter of George Charles Beech Hooper (April 1846 – 23 June 1920) and Emma Jane Hooper, née Taylor, (1847 – 8 July 1931), of "Strathmore", Grey Street, East Melbourne, Victoria, later of 18 Rosstown Road, Carnegie, Victoria/East Caulfield, Victoria.

=== Career ===
In 1894 she was appearing in shows as a member of the "Parisian Pas de Quatre" with Annie Cobb, Lena Cassellis, and Alice Mitchell.

She appeared as a harlequin in the 1896 Christmas pantomime at Her Majesty's Theatre, Sydney, choreographed by Emilia Pasta and produced by Charles B. Westmacott for Williamson and Musgrove and "trouser parts" in successive pantos, the later ballets being arranged by Minnie Everett.

In 1902 she appeared in a series of musical plays at the Criterion: George Dance's operetta The Lady Slavey directed by J. F. Sheridan, closely followed by Mrs Goldstein, written by Sheridan and F. W. Weierter, (Note: Frederick William Weierter (4 March 1858 – 25 August 1942), also spelled Whirter, Wheirter etc., arrived in Adelaide in 1883, served as organist at Mount Gambier, then Williamstown, Victoria, later editor of The Scottish Australian. He was the author of several operas: Tommy and The Wizard of Owhyhee (both 1910)) and Little Christopher Columbus, in which Hooper was praised. She led the ballet in Uncle Tom's Cabin and a revival of A Trip to Chicago. She also produced a pantomime Cinderella, which ran for four weeks, and at its conclusion Hooper and Rosevear, who designed the costumes, were each presented with an engraved gold watch by a grateful Sheridan. Other work for Sheridan included The Lady (or New) Barmaid (1903) with music by John Crook,

In 1919 she made a claim against J. C. Williamson's of £30 for salary withheld during government-imposed closure of theatres due to the influenza epidemic. She succeeded on the grounds that the restrictions applied to Melbourne city, and her contract was not limited to the metropolitan district.

== Family ==
Minnie Hooper married Ernest Cox Rose (died 24 June 1941) on 15 December 1896. They had one son

- John David Rose (born c. 1932)

They had a home, "Wiltshire Hall", Brook and Alfreda streets, Coogee, New South Wales.

Two sisters were dancers:

- Fifth daughter, Ruby Effie May Hooper (1885–1960) operated a dance academy in Sydney and played in pantomimes. She married a Mr Moser.
- Sixth daughter Violet Alice Rose "Vi" Hooper (1887–1964) shared a dance academy with Hilda McMurtry at 343 Swanston Street, Melbourne. She married a Mr Carl.
