= James Hay (singer) =

Australian tenor (1885–1958)

Peter James Hay (21 August 1885 – 1 July 1958) was an Australian tenor, noted for appearances in Gilbert and Sullivan operas. He alternated membership of the D'Oyly Carte Opera Company in England with Australian tours, mostly for J. C. Williamson's.

== History ==
Hay was born at Donnybrook, (Note: Luton, another suburb south of Clare, has also been mentioned as his birthplace. Neither location can be found on today's maps or Manning's index of SA place names.) near Clare, South Australia, a son of Peter Hay, a Scottish limeburner, himself a fine tenor, bringing up his son with a love of singing. Hay left with his family for Perth, Western Australia, at age twelve, and at some stage began singing with the Anglican cathedral choir, and at age 17 commenced study with Signor Lardelli, then for two years with J. B. Huntington. He had been in and out of business in Perth for eight years, and left for Melbourne with an introduction to a Scottish businessman. but his music came first; he secured singing engagements with the Philharmonic and the Liedertafel. The businessman took him to Marshall-Hall, who advised him to seek the best teachers in France and England. Sponsored by the businessman, he left for England where he was a fellow-student of Fraser Gange, a Scottish baritone who later had a career with Amy Evans. He studied German Lieder under Amy Sherwin and then went to Paris, studying under Bouhy and Jean de Reszke. He joined the Chappell Ballad Singers and sang for Sir Henry Wood in six promenade concerts ("The Proms"). In 1909 he gave a successful recital in London. (Note: The Times—"The young tenor who gave a vocal recital in Bechstein Hall has adopted the right method in regard to voice production, and his diction in French is remarkably good. His tone is powerful, and the quality is of the kind which most people like, He can express what he wants, and he phrases quite musically. In Fauré's Roses d'Ispahan his voice was at its best, and in two songs by Debussy, Romance and Le Temps a laissé son manteau, he got the right atmosphere.") He then sang with the Royal Choral Society in Beethoven's Missa Solemnis and in Berlioz's Faust, under Hans Richter and toured with Ada Crossley and Tetrazzini. He studied oratorio under Alberto Randegger. He deputised for Gervase Elwes in the name part of Elgar's Gerontius.

=== Gilbert and Sullivan ===
Around July 1913 he joined D'Oyly Carte's Principal Repertory Opera Company, initially in the chorus, then making his stage debut as Fairfax in The Yeomen of the Guard. He played various other tenor parts until March 1915: Ralph Rackstraw in H.M.S. Pinafore, Prince Hilarion in Princess Ida, Nanki-Poo in The Mikado and his favorite part, Earl Tolloller in Iolanthe. He alternated with Dewey Gibson as Frederic in The Pirates of Penzance 1913–14.

After The Great War he rejoined D'Oyly Carte's Repertory Company for the 1919–1920 revivals, leaving in March for La Cigale at King's Theatre, Hammersmith. He then joined J. C. Williamson's Gilbert and Sullivan Opera Company as principal tenor, touring Australia.

From July 1920 to November 1921 and from April 1926 to April 1928 he made a great number of appearances in Gilbert and Sullivan operas for Williamson, mostly produced by Minnie Everett, with Gustave Slapoffski musical director, beginning with The Mikado at Her Majesty's Theatre, Melbourne. and ending with The Gondoliers. He produced Ruddigore, which also starred Strella Wilson, Charles Walenn and John Ralston, touring 1927–1928. Adelaide in June 1927 marked the Australian premiere of that opera.

Between 1922 and 1926 he was mostly in England with D'Oyly Carte or other companies. Hay's last stint with D'Oyly Carte was from July 1925 to January 1926, during which time he played the Duke in Patience, Tolloller in Iolanthe, Nanki-Poo in The Mikado, and Richard Dauntless in Ruddigore.

== Personal ==
Hay died in Brighton, England.
