= Villiers Arnold =

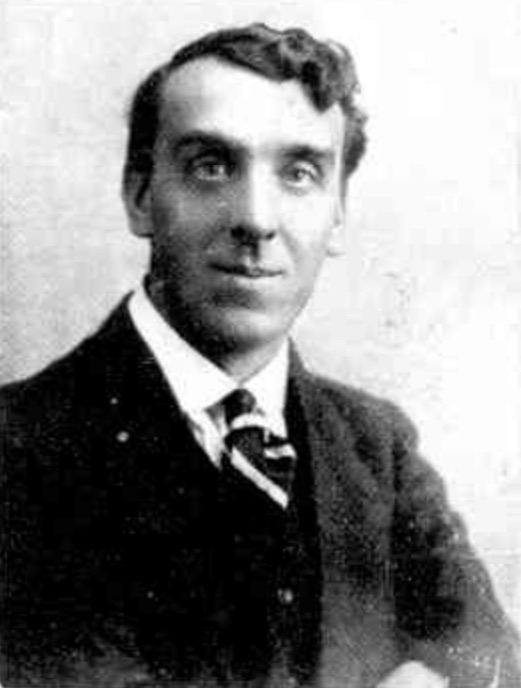
Villiers Arnold in 1914

George Villiers Arnold (18 April 1876 – 21 May 1921) was an English actor and baritone singer, popular in Australia for his roles in Gilbert and Sullivan operas.

== History ==
Arnold was born in London, the elder son of J. A. Arnold and Mrs Blanche Ellerman.

He first appeared with the chorus of the D'Oyly Carte Opera Company in H.M.S. Pinafore at the Savoy Theatre in 1899. In 1901 he transferred to D'Oyly Carte's repertory company, playing supporting roles Samuel in The Pirates of Penzance, Strephon in Iolanthe, Florian in Princess Ida, Pish-Tush in The Mikado, Sir Richard Cholmondeley in The Yeomen of the Guard, and Luiz in The Gondoliers. He continued playing those and similar roles for several years, acting as stand-in for major parts, so on occasion got to play Archibald Grosvenor in Patience, Sir Joseph Porter in H.M.S. Pinafore, General Stanley in The Pirates of Penzance, Reginald Bunthorne in Patience, the Lord Chancellor in Iolanthe, King Gama in Princess Ida, Ko-Ko in The Mikado, Jack Point in The Yeomen of the Guard, and the Duke of Plaza-Toro in The Gondoliers.

In 1914 he left for South Africa, where he joined J. C. Williamson's Gilbert and Sullivan Opera Company's production of The Mikado, and on to Sydney by the steamer Marathon. On 27 June 1914 the company opened at Her Majesty's, Melbourne with The Gondoliers, Arnold playing Giuseppe.

He played many of the same roles in Minnie Everett's G&S productions in 1920. His last role was as a cobbler in a production of Chu Chin Chow in which his wife also appeared.

He died from pleurisy and pneumonia in a private hospital in Sydney and was buried at the Waverley Cemetery after a service at St Andrew's Cathedral.

== Family ==
Arnold married twice: in Sheffield, England in 1902, to Florence Beech. They divorced in 1910 and he married again, in Wellington, New Zealand, to the actress Pearl Ladd (1883–1977) on 11 September 1916.
