= C. J. Z. Woinarski =

Australian lawyer and judge

Casimir Julius Zichy Woinarski (c. 1863 – 21 December 1935), often hyphenated as Zichy-Woinarski, was an Australian lawyer and judge.

== History ==
Woinarski by David Low

Woinarski was born at Taradale, Victoria, third son of George Gustave Zichy-Woinarski, and was a student at the Melbourne Church of England Grammar School, under Dr. Bromley. He won an exhibition which allowed him to entered Trinity College, Melbourne, where he had a successful academic career. He was called to the Bar in 1885, and subsequently graduated as master of laws and master of arts from Melbourne University, where he teamed up with John Monash to edit the University Magazine and later became an examiner at the Law faculty. He was appointed Crown Prosecutor in 1910, in 1911 was appointed KC. Though a thorough gentleman in other respects, he was contemptuous of hardened criminals and cynical of any possibility of reform, showing them no mercy, to the extent of ordering the lash on occasion.

In 1918 he was promoted to the County Court Bench, where he heard many important arbitration cases.

He suffered a leg injury in October 1935 and was granted six months' leave of absence to recuperate but died at his home in South Yarra.

== Family ==
Woinarski married Lily Musgrove, daughter of George Musgrove, on 23 May 1898. They had two sons, and a daughter. Both sons became lawyers.
