= Leo Darnton =

English tenor (1890–1944)

Leopold Darnton (21 March 1890 – 31 August 1944), invariably referred to as Leo Darnton, was an English tenor, singing in Gilbert and Sullivan operas with the D'Oyly Carte Opera Company. He settled in Australia, where he enjoyed considerable success before his early death by heart attack. His greatest role was as Franz Schubert in Lilac Time.

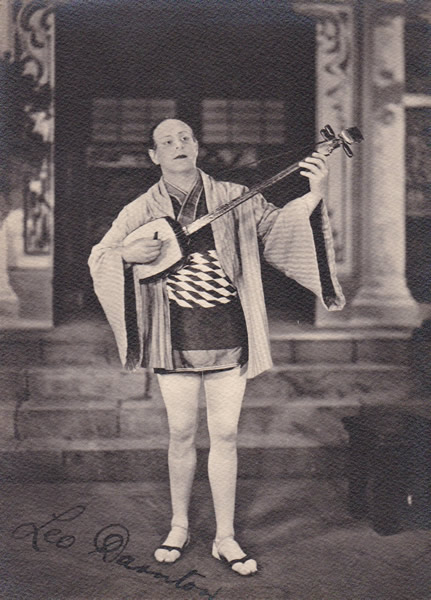
Darnton as Nanki-Poo in The Mikado

== History ==
Darnton was born in Pontefract, Yorkshire, and was originally destined for the Indian Civil Service, but was drawn to the theatre. He first appeared on stage in 1911 as a pierrot, and worked his way up the comic opera "ladder", along with the likes of Leslie Henson, Milton Hayes, Jack Buchanan, Margaret Cooper, Charles Heslop, and Carrie Tubb, performing in bandstands and seaside pavilions, until he secured a place at the Empire Theatre, London. He served in the army with the London Scottish through the Great War, when he lost three brothers.

In 1920 he joined the D'Oyly Carte company, where he was closely associated with tenor James Hay and baritone Frederick Hobbs, and played almost every substantial G&S tenor role with the D'Oyly Carte No.1 company. In 1924 he was demoted to D'Oyly Carte's "New Opera Company" and in 1925 left the company.

He was then recruited by Nevin Tait of J. C. Williamson's (JCW) as one of ten performers contracted to play a series of operettas at the Tivoli Theatre, Sydney. He arrived in Melbourne, Australia, on the P & O liner Cathay, passing through Adelaide on 19 September 1925. He subsequently toured Australia in vaudeville. JCW's Gilbert and Sullivan season, produced by Minnie Everett, followed in mid-1926. Short seasons in Adelaide and Melbourne — Trial by Jury with HMS Pinafore, and Princess Ida — followed by other capital cities with those shows and others, to good houses and excellent reviews. Darnton's Leonard Meryll in The Yeomen of the Guard when he had "little to do, but did it exceedingly well". and Cyril in Princess Ida were noticed.

Williamson's Gilbert and Sullivan Company was disbanded in 1928, but Darnton remained in Australia. That year he played in Lilac Time, initially as Von Schwind, the painter, to John Ralston's Schubert, but when Ralston took ill, he settled into the lead part. The songs which had been transposed to suit Ralston's baritone were returned to their original key. This production toured much of Australia to good houses, and increasing recognition of Darnton's part. Other operettas followed, including a few Gilbert and Sullivan pieces. Darnton had a place in every production, and was given meatier roles in some: Marco rather than Luiz in The Gondoliers, and his "Take a Pair of Sparkling Eyes" was applauded. He played Pierre Birabeau (the "Red Shadow") in The Desert Song, Prince Carl in The Student Prince, François Villon in The Vagabond King, Baldassaré in The Maid of the Mountains and Captain Duval in The New Moon. In May 1937 he played a "appropriately supercilious" Alexus in a revival of The Chocolate Soldier.

In June 1937 he appeared in a new production of Lilac Time as Franz Schubert. The public had strong memories of John Ralston in the part in 1920, but Darnton, who had played the part in 1919 at Shaftesbury Theatre with Clara Butterworth as Lilli Veit, was able to put his own stamp on the part, receiving outstanding notices in Sydney and Brisbane.

That was Darnton's last tour; he was having heart problems and opened a studio where he took students for voice coaching.

From 1926 Darnton had regular singing appearances on radio station 3LO. He appeared in radio musicals throughout Australia, broadcast from 2FC Sydney, partnered with such stars as Marie Bremner with the New Theatre Orchestra and A.B.C. (Sydney) Wireless Chorus.

He contributed much to amateur choral and theatre groups: he sang Ruddigore with the Sydney Musical Society; he joined with Gladys Moncrieff, Eileen Boyd and others raising funds for Doris Fitton's Independent Theatre, played in The Chocolate Soldier and Lilac Time with the Mosman Musical Society,

He died suddenly at his studio.

== Other interests ==
Before leaving for Australia, Darnton had a reputation as a fine athlete, particularly in swimming, having made three credible attempts at a cross-channel swim. He represented England in swimming and boxing at the Olympic Games. He was also a competitive billiards player and golfer.

He studied German lieder for nine months under Hugo Heinz in Berlin, and four months with Dr Leihammer in Vienna. His special study of Franz Schubert was said to inform his portrayal of the composer in Lilac Time.
