= Dame Nellie Melba Scholarship =

Scholarships awarded by or in the name of Nellie Melba

Dame Nellie Melba Scholarship may refer to any of several prizes awarded by the great soprano or in her name.

== London ==
In 1911 Melba donated a scholarship of £30 tenable at the Guildhall School of Music for one year's tuition, at least partly as a tribute to her friend the conductor Landon Ronald, who had recently taken over as a principal of the School. The scholarship would be awarded by competition, open to sopranos aged between 16 and 22, of which there were around forty candidates, most already Guildhall students. The Guildhall School of Music was at the time competing for students with the Royal Academy of Music and the Royal College of Music.

Among successful candidates were:

- 1912 Dora Briscoe
- 1915 Dorothy Waring

== Melbourne ==
The first Australian Melba Scholarship, organised by the ANA, was a vocal scholarship of £30, of which £10 was provided by Dame Nellie and the remainder by Warrnambool local interests.

- 1908 Elsie (later Elsa) Warman

Albert Street Conservatorium

A scholarship, valued at 75 guineas, tenable for two years' tuition at the Albert Street Conservatorium, was inaugurated in 1916.

- 1916 Doris L. Leech

Nathalie Muir won an exhibition and Ruby Croft an honorable mention, though subsequent reports claim both these contestants as prizewinners.

- 1919 Eileen Mary Starr
- 1921 Marie Bremner
- 1924 Alma O'Dea
- 1927 Victoria Wilson won "special Melba scholarship" later Mrs Schleebs
- 1930 Mary Pitman, later, as Margaret Pitman, embroiled in dispute over her mother's will.

Melba died in 1931 leaving, inter alia, £8,000 to the Albert Street Conservatorium to provide a continuing scholarship. Much was expended in settling points of law regarding the setting up and administration of the bequest.
Henceforth called Melba Bequest Scholarship, open to women of 17 years or older, any voice, trained or untrained.

- 1935 Hinemoa Rosieur (N.Z.)
- 1937 Jean Love (Vic.)
- 1940 Sybil Willey (Qld.)
- 1943 Elsie Morison (Vic.)
- 1946 Beryl Jones (declined) Sylvia Biddle (Qld.)(accepted)
- 1949 Joyce Simmons (Vic.)
- 1952 Jean Munro (Qld.)
- 1958 Aldene Splatt (Vic.)
- 1962 Elizabeth Tippett (Vic.)
- 1965 Margot Cory (Vic.)

Melba Memorial Conservatorium of Music
(from 1956 the renamed Albert Street Conservatorium)

may include

- Victor Olof, violinist
- Patrick Roberts, violinist

Melba Opera Trust
Took over from Melba Memorial Conservatorium in 2008

- 2009, 2010 Stephanie Gibson
- 2010 Janet Todd

2010 Jacqueline Porter

- 2011, 2012 Lauren Fagan
- 2013 Emily Edmonds
- 2014, 2015 Jade Moffat mezzo-soprano
- 2016, 2017 Zoe Drummond
- 2018 Jessica Harper soprano
- 2019 Tessa Hayward
- 2020 Rebecca Hart mezzo-soprano
- 2021 Katherine Allen

== Elsewhere ==
Artists claimed to have won a Melba scholarship, for which no further information has been found, include

- Dora Labbette "studied with Lisa Lehmann on a Melba Scholarship" — Oxford Reference
- Mabel Gibson
- Anona Winn (born Anona Edna Wilkins)
