= Mabel Gibson =

Australian singer and actor

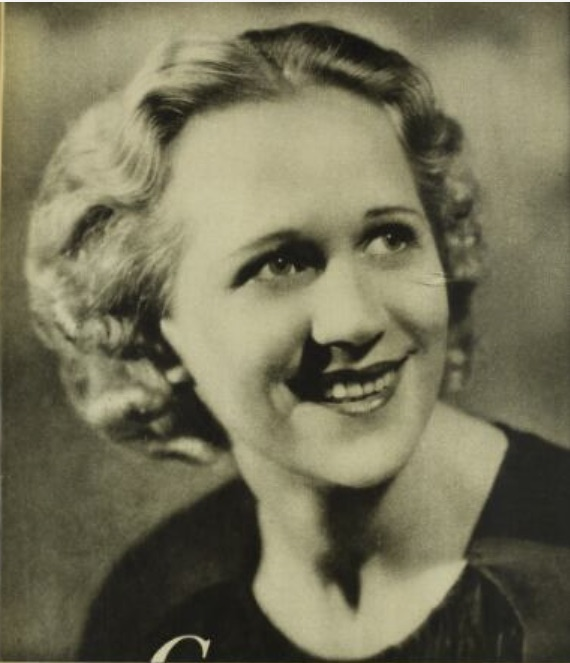
- Gibson in 1937
- Born: Mabel Wennstrom Gibson; Perth, Western Australia
- Died: June 1952; Ohio, United States
- Other name: Catherine Vennstrom
- Education: Albert Street Conservatorium
- Occupations: Singer, actor
- Spouse: Paul Hebrick Long (m. 1938)

Mabel Wennstrom Gibson (1901 – 1951) was an Australian singer and actor, best known for playing in musicals and operettas.

== History ==
Gibson was born in Perth, Western Australia, a daughter of builder and Perth councillor Sydney Gibson and his wife Catherine Charlotte Gibson, née Wennstrom (1879 – 2 May 1931). As a child, she studied piano under Richard Bastian, dancing under Flora Lewin and Alice Patten, and shone in juvenile pantomime. She passed the L.A.B. examinations in pianoforte, and won a Dame Nellie Melba Scholarship, to study at the Albert Street Conservatorium.

She played in several amateur theatre groups before being engaged with JC Williamson's

The Gibson family moved from the Mount Lawley suburb of Perth to the Melbourne suburb of Northcote sometime around 1925.

Her first engagements with JC Williamson's were as Clarice Hardwicke's understudy in Sybil and as one of the trio of sisters in Lilac Time. She went on to play Therese in Ma Mie Rosette, Margot Spreckles in Sybil, Natalie in The Merry Widow, Juanita in A Southern Maid, Estelle in The Street Singer, Annetta in The Lady of the Rose by Jean Gilbert and Harry Graham, Dora in Funny Face, and Vittoria in The Maid of the Mountains, all supporting roles.

In Gilbert & Sullivan, she took a variety of roles — soprano, mezzo-soprano and contralto — the last in trios with the sopranos Strella Wilson and Patti Russell. She was applauded for her Phoebe in The Yeomen of the Guard

She appeared as a hospital nurse in the film Diggers, a.k.a. Dinkum Diggers, produced at Efftee Studios by Pat Hanna.

In 1933 she left for London where, to avoid confusion with another performer of a similar name, she took the stage name "Catherine Vennstrom", echoing her mother's birthname, and in London's West End starred in Lawrence Wright's revue On With the Show at the Prince's Theatre.

She left for America, where she played Adelina von Hagen in Edward Locke's The Climax opposite Guy Bates Post at the Hollywood Playhouse, and appeared in James B. Fagan's And So To Bed at the Music Box Theatre. She auditioned for film roles, but was told she was "an inch or two too tall".

She returned to Sydney in June 1935, and landed a role in Ball at the Savoy, opening at the Theatre Royal on 6 July 1935.

She married an American, Paul Hebrick Long, at St Mark's Church, Darling Point on 29 October 1938 and moved to Ohio, where she died in 1951.

Her sister Jean Gibson, a chorine with J. C. Williamson's, left for Germany in 1936.
