= Elsie Griffin =

English opera singer (1895–1989)

Postcard autographed by Elsie Griffin, c. 1921

Elsie Griffin (6 December 1895 – 21 December 1989) was an English opera singer, best known for her performances in the soprano roles of the Savoy Operas with the D'Oyly Carte Opera Company.

Beginning her career by entertaining British troops in France during World War I, she popularised such songs as "Danny Boy". She was a principal soprano with the D'Oyly Carte from 1919 to 1926, also recording several of her roles with the company both during that time and afterwards. She married another D'Oyly Carte performer, J. Ivan "Jimmy" Menzies, in 1923. She continued her singing and acting careers into the 1950s, including tours with the Carl Rosa Opera Company from 1934 to 1937.

== Life and career ==
Elsie Griffin was born in Bristol, England, and sang onstage as a child prodigy. She attended the St. Michael's on the Mount Primary School. She was joint winner in the mezzo-soprano category at the Bristol Music Festival in 1914. During World War I, she made her professional debut in the concerts of Lena Ashwell's company, formed at the request of King George V, singing concerts to entertain Britain's troops in France. John Arlott wrote of her, "Hers was the voice in Fred Weatherly's songs, "Danny Boy" and "Roses of Picardy", that is preserved in the mind's ear of surviving 1914–1918 trench fodder." Her performances of these two songs made them into two of the most popular hits of the era.

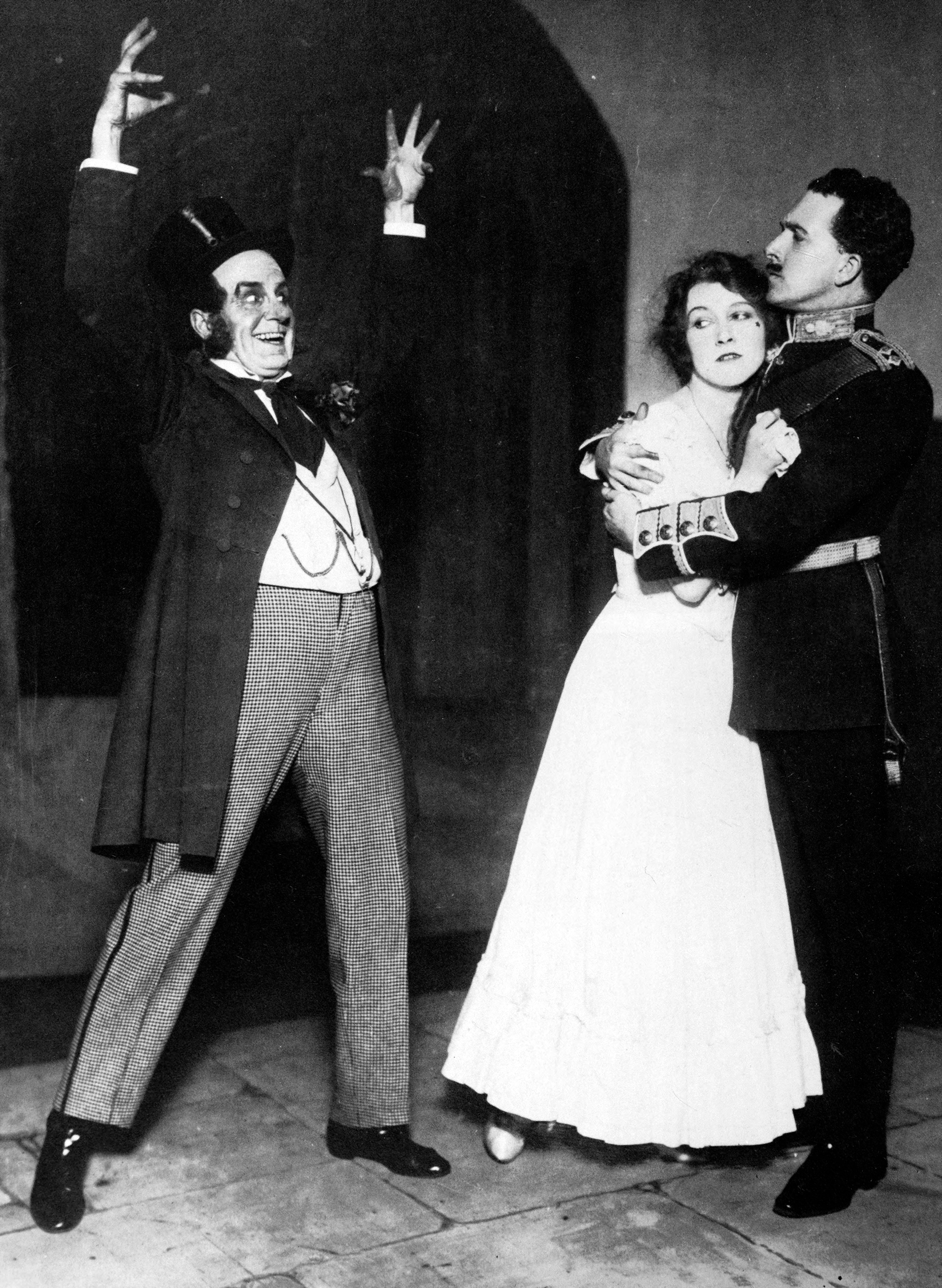
Henry Lytton, Griffin and Derek Oldham in The Sorcerer, c. 1920

After further concert work in 1918, Griffin was engaged by the D'Oyly Carte Opera Company in 1919, immediately appearing on tour in the leading roles of Josephine in H.M.S. Pinafore and Gianetta in The Gondoliers, and in the smaller part of Kate in The Yeomen of the Guard. She soon added (sometimes sharing) the leading roles of Aline in The Sorcerer, Mabel in The Pirates of Penzance and Phyllis in Iolanthe. She also briefly played the small role of Lady Ella in Patience. She was immediately singled out for praise: The Observer called her "a vocalist of real distinction". Her colleague, Derek Oldham said of her Mabel, "Every note dead in its centre, every run as clear as a whistle, and the whole number sung with an ease and mastery which has never been bettered." In 1921, she added the roles of Yum-Yum in The Mikado and Rose Maybud in Ruddigore.

In 1923, Griffin married fellow D'Oyly Carte artiste Ivan Menzies. The couple had a daughter, Mahala Menzies. She continued to play or share these principal soprano roles and sometimes the two smaller ones, finally adding to her repertoire the part of Casilda in The Gondoliers in 1925. She played Yum-Yum in the company's four-minute silent promotional film of The Mikado in 1926. When The Mikado became the first Gilbert and Sullivan opera to be broadcast by the BBC later that year, Griffin reprised her role as Yum-Yum. In 1927, she left the company but returned from time to time to participate in recordings.

In 1929, Griffin appeared at the Playhouse Theatre in The Rose and the Ring. She performed frequently in concerts, oratorio and variety, giving on one occasion at the London Coliseum "a not over-exhilarating exhibition of that after dinner, drawing room type of singing which is happily a thing of the past." As a broadcaster, Griffin was continually engaged by the BBC in a range of work from light duets, comic duets (with her husband), and solos, to opera, appearing in broadcasts of Delibes's comic opera Le roi l'a dit with Heddle Nash and George Baker, and Carmen.

Griffin appeared in a British tour of Wild Violets, and toured in South Africa in Gilbert and Sullivan operas and in Lilac Time in 1933 with the J. C. Williamson company. She also toured with the Carl Rosa Opera Company from 1934 to 1937, singing leading roles in Die Fledermaus, The Barber of Seville, Carmen, Romeo and Juliet, The Tales of Hoffmann, Faust and The Elixir of Love. Her last stage role was in The Vanishing Island, a Moral Re-Armament musical, in which she and her husband toured around the world from 1955 until 1957. Despite chronic illness, during the D'Oyly Carte Opera Company's centennial season in 1975, Griffin and her husband participated in the final performance of Trial by Jury, in which the company's regular chorus was augmented by fourteen former stars of the company.

Griffin died in Blackheath, Surrey, in 1989, aged 94. The Times called her "one of the leading coloratura sopranos in the 1920s and 1930s". A blue plaque at St. Michael's on the Mount Primary School commemorates her life.

== Recordings ==
Griffin was an experienced recording artist by the time she joined the D'Oyly Carte Opera Company. Her recordings with the company included Rose Maybud and Zorah in Ruddigore (1924) and Yum-Yum in The Mikado (1926). She also sang Yum-Yum in a BBC radio broadcast with D'Oyly Carte that year. After she left the company, she returned to record Mabel in Pirates (1929), Kate in Yeomen (1929) and Josephine in Pinafore (1930). Her 1929 recording of "Poor Wandering One" from the Pirates set, when released separately, was voted the best British gramophone solo that year, and a review in The Gramophone said, "It is Elsie Griffin, however, with her deliciously fresh and effortless singing, who demands – and receives – the big bouquet. Her "Poor Wandering One" is a sheer joy – brilliant but never shrill, and with trills that would not discredit the great Galli-Curci herself." When the 1929 recording was reissued on LP in 1981, a critic for The New York Times wrote that her "'secure coloratura and bell-like purity of tone' made her the definitive Mabel."
