= Dorothy Gill =

British opera singer and actress

Dorothy Gill (1891 – 7 April 1969) was a British opera singer and actress, best known for her performances in the contralto roles of the Savoy Operas with the D'Oyly Carte Opera Company.

After entertaining troops in France during the First World War, Gill toured for three years in The Beggar's Opera as Lucy Lockett. She joined a touring cast of the D'Oyly Carte Opera Company from 1925 to 1927, playing the contralto roles in the Gilbert and Sullivan operas. She then appeared in a musical adaptation of The Rose and the Ring in the West End for two holiday seasons and toured in Australia and New Zealand in Gilbert and Sullivan. She returned to D'Oyly Carte from 1931 to 1936 and was so popular in the company's visit to New York City in 1934 that US fans petitioned for her return to America.

== Life and career ==
Gill was born in Mhow, India, in 1891, to Irish parents. She lived in India, Ceylon and South Africa and entertained British troops in France during the First World War. In the early 1920s she toured for three years in Nigel Playfair's production of The Beggar's Opera, as Lucy Lockett, including a run at the Lyric Theatre, Hammersmith.

She joined one of the touring casts of the D'Oyly Carte Opera Company in December 1925 and one month later was promoted to principal contralto. Her roles included Ruth in The Pirates of Penzance, Lady Jane in Patience, The Fairy Queen in Iolanthe, Katisha in The Mikado, Dame Hannah in Ruddigore and the Duchess of Plaza-Toro in The Gondoliers. In June 1927, that touring company closed. Gill next appeared in London in a musical adaptation of The Rose and the Ring at the Apollo Theatre and the Playhouse Theatre from November 1928 to February 1929, and again, at the Lyric Theatre, Hammersmith, from December 1929 to January 1930. She later toured in Australia and New Zealand playing the same contralto Gilbert and Sullivan roles as she had with D'Oyly Carte.

After returning to England, she joined the main D'Oyly Carte company in September 1931 after the accidental death of Bertha Lewis. Until her retirement in June 1936, she was the company's principal contralto, playing the roles of Lady Sangazure in The Sorcerer, Little Buttercup in H.M.S. Pinafore, Ruth, Lady Jane, the Fairy Queen, Lady Blanche in Princess Ida, Katisha, Dame Hannah, Dame Carruthers in The Yeomen of the Guard and the Duchess of Plaza Toro. When the company visited New York City in 1934, Gill made a strong impression upon American audiences. American fans dedicated to her a book of their tributes to the company, "Nothing But Toffee" (1934) and petitioned Rupert D'Oyly Carte, unsuccessfully, to bring Gill back to New York in 1936.

Gill died in London in 1969 at the age of 78.

== Recordings ==
Gill's recordings with the D'Oyly Carte Opera Company included Dame Carruthers in Yeomen (1928), Ruth in Pirates (1929), Dame Hannah Ruddigore (1931), Lady Blanche in Princess Ida (1932) and Lady Sangazure in the abridged 1933 Sorcerer.

== Sources ==
- Ayre, Leslie (1972). The Gilbert & Sullivan Companion. London: W.H. Allen & Co Ltd.
