= Bernard Manning (singer) =

English singer and actor

Bernard Manning (c. 1886 – 5 May 1962) was an English singer and actor who had a career in Australia, notably in Gilbert and Sullivan operas. After retiring from the professional stage, he promoted amateur productions in Perth, Western Australia.

== History ==
Manning was born in Melbourne, Derbyshire, (Note: This is the village which gave Lord Melbourne his name, hence the Australian city.) the youngest son of farmer Robert Manning Smith. He began singing in the cathedral choir in Lichfield in Staffordshire, living and studying at a college attached to the cathedral. When his voice broke he lost his place in the choir, so returned to the farm. He spent a year as a jackaroo on a cattle station near Maryborough, Queensland. Some reports attribute this move to a search for a healthier climate, others to his interest in veterinary science, though it may have simply been "colonial experience". While in Queensland he joined the choir of the Anglican cathedral, Brisbane, as a tenor. Returning to England, he studied for four years at the Guildhall School of Music, London where, though his voice encompassed a wide range (low D to top A), Sir Landon Ronald insisted on him singing bass. He won a scholarship for singing German folksong, and studied oratorio. Rather than relying on his voice for a living he also studied medicine, qualifying as a veterinarian. When the war came he enlisted and fought in France, where he suffered from a poison gas attack but was otherwise uninjured. In 1919 he joined the D'Oyly Carte Opera Company, singing Gilbert and Sullivan, then in 1925 left for Australia under contract to J. C. Williamson, remaining with his troupes for 25 years.

=== Roles ===
Manning played 23 roles in G & S, but was famous for four, several of which he played over 1,000 times:

- Possibly his greatest role was as the Emperor, the name part in The Mikado. As with every other role, he played the part with total sincerity, insisting that "playing it straight" made the farcical situations more enjoyable to the audience.
- The Pirate King in Pirates of Penzance was another speciality. He knew three parts in each opera, so he could step in at a moment's notice, but was careful to emulate the other actor's style so as not to upset the dynamics of the play — sometimes other cast members were unaware of the substitution.
- He was praised also for his Grand Inquisitor in The Gondoliers. Manning made a hobby of sitting in on criminal trials, sometimes being invited to sit on the Bench, and used these experiences to inform his acting.
- Dick Deadeye in Pinafore

Mountararat in Iolanthe and Roderick Murgatroyd in Ruddigore have also been mentioned as memorable roles.

== Last years ==
Manning retired in December 1950 and moved to Perth, where he married Mildred Hagenauer Le Souef, a biology teacher at Wesley College and daughter of zoologist E. A. Le Souef. In 1940 he was engaged to Margaret "Madge" Miller of South Yarra, but nothing further has been found. His marriage to Le Souef was the culmination of a friendship which began in 1930, when Manning visited Col. Le Souef at his home in South Perth.

Once settled in Perth, Manning set about formation of the Gilbert and Sullivan Society of W.A. for the benefit of the many enthusiasts in the city. The society was formed in May 1951, with Manning elected president, with Marie Bremner and William Beecham vice-presidents. One early activity of the Society was to play recordings from one or other of the operas, and for members to take the spoken lines between the songs. Their first production was HMS Pinafore at the Assembly Hall, co-produced by Nita Pannell and Manning, who also played Dick Deadeye. The critic "Fidelio" thought the play creditably performed. Beecham succeeded Manning as president of the Society, which played The Pirates of Penzance for two weeks at His Majesty's Theatre in November 1953 to critical acclaim. In August 1954 the Society played The Mikado, again to excellent reviews. Earle Nowotny was musical director for the Society's productions.

Manning died in Royal Perth Hospital.
