= Patti Russell =

Australian soprano

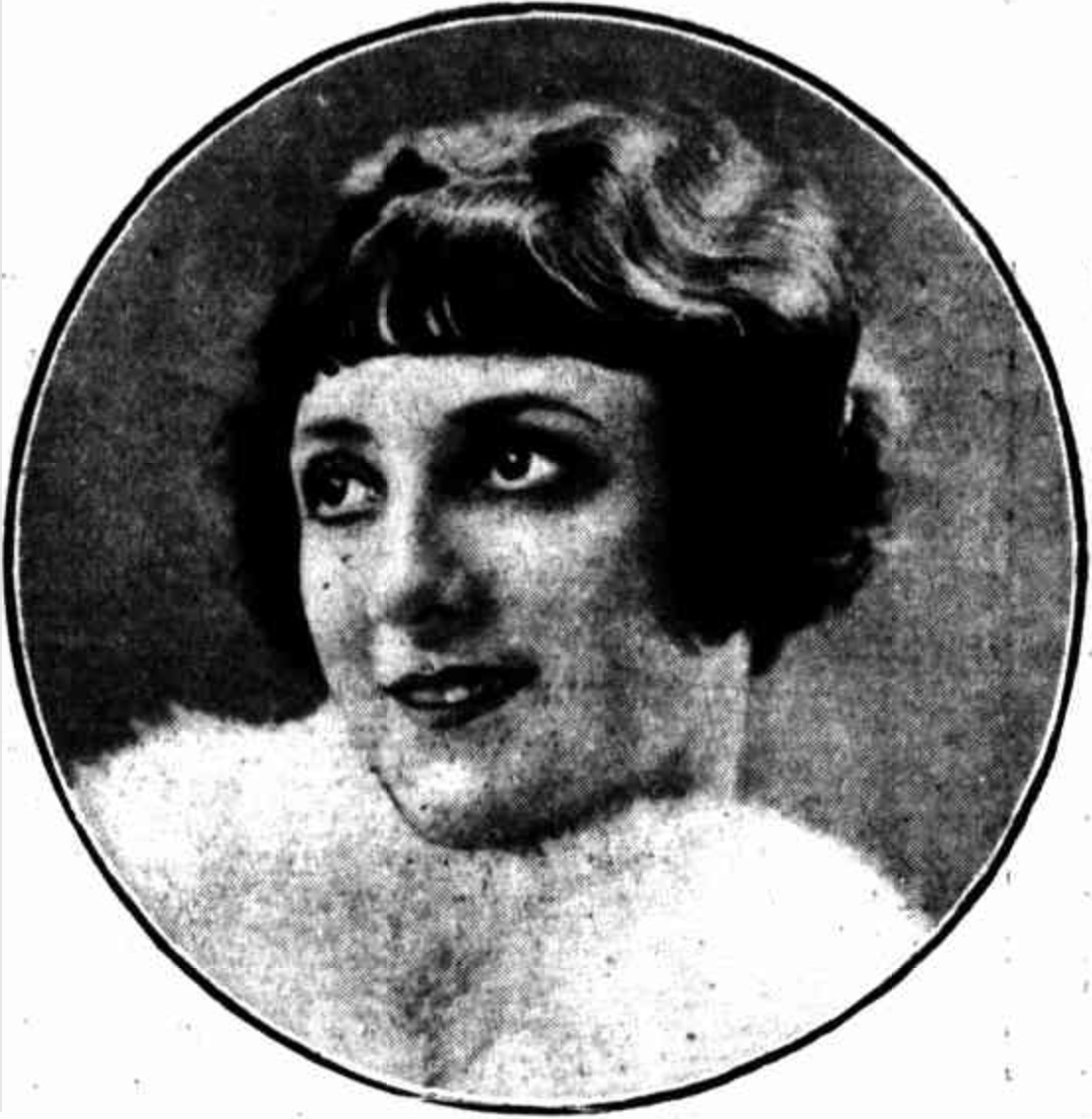
Patti Russell in 1927

Patti Russell was an Australian soprano singer, playing in grand opera and Gilbert and Sullivan for nine years (1919–1928) to universal acclaim. Little is known of her early life, or any subsequent activities.

Russell was born of Scottish ancestry in Sydney and, with help from a Government scholarship, trained at the State Conservatorium of Music under Mrs Haffenden Smith and Madame Slapoffski. While still a student, she was chosen at a NSW State Orchestra concert, to sing Schubert's aria The Shepherd on the Rock.

In 1918, against her parents' wishes, she joined Frank Rigo's Grand Opera Company (taken over by J. C. Williamson in 1919), winning praise for her Nedda in Pagliacci and Marguerita in Faust. She came to public attention for the way she replaced Amy Castles as Mimi in La bohème at Her Majesty's Theatre, Sydney on 29 September 1919, with no opportunity of rehearsal. She also stepped in for Strella Wilson as Elsie Maynard in The Yeomen of the Guard.

Other favorite roles were Antonia in The Tales of Hoffmann, Phyllis in Iolanthe, Lili in Lilac Time, Mad Margaret in Ruddigore, and Yum Yum in The Mikado, perhaps her last role in Australia. The star of so many performances did not appear again in newspaper advertisements or reviews. There was no benefit for her, no farewell, just the occasional historical reference.

A less flattering critic was A. L. Kelly:

Miss Patti Russell does unequal work; sometimes singing well, but frequently showing limitations of style and vocal resource. She looked well and did her best work as Phyllis in Iolanthe.

In January 1936 someone reported she had been seen in England.
