= Gregory Stroud =

English singer

Gregory Stroud (Note: He is not to be confused with Captain W. G. Stroud of Bondi later of Bellevue Hill, whose son John married Barbara Fea in 1952; perhaps the same person as Walter Gregory Stroud, of Western Australia, born in Folkestone, Kent, on 20 September 1887.) (5 September 1892 – December 1974) was an English singer, a light baritone best known for Gilbert and Sullivan operettas. He had several highly successful seasons in Australia, where he retired.

== History ==
Stroud was born in Margate, Kent, and brought up at Pegwell Bay, near Ramsgate. He studied singing in London under Albert Visetti, and was coached in opera by the conductor Albert Coates. He had a career on the concert platform, appearing at the Boosey Ballad concerts, and Queen's Hall orchestral concerts, and was engaged by Robert Courtneidge in musical comedy. He enlisted with the Royal Navy during the Great War, engaged in submarine hunting. He sang in the chorus of A Country Girl at Daly's Theatre. Before he left for Australia he was singing with the Harrison concert party, a violin, 'cello, and piano combination.

In 1920 Stroud was contracted by Robert Greig of Australia's Tivoli circuit to play in The Lilac Domino in that country. The revues Oddments and Bran Pie followed, then the musicals Maggie (Note: English version by H. F. Maltby and Fred Thompson of the French Maggie by Étienne Rey and Jacques Bousquet.) and Chu Chin Chow as Nur-al-Din, making a "Ton of Money" for Hugh D. McIntosh. It was good business for Stroud too, as his success made news in London and he was booked for the musical Sally soon after his return. After Sally, at the Winter Garden Theatre, came Pablo Luna's The First Kiss at the New Oxford Theatre, Katja, the Dancer and others. He joined the D'Oyly Carte organization, first in the New Opera Company, then with their Repertory Opera Company at the Princes Theatre for the London season, playing Archibald Grosvenor in Patience, Giuseppe in The Gondoliers, Strephon in Iolanthe, and Florian in Princess Ida. He left D'Oyly Carte in December 1926.

Stroud returned to Australia in 1930, this time for J. C. Williamson's (JCW), touring Gilbert and Sullivan (G&S) in 1931, appearing in Trial by Jury as Counsel for the Plaintiff; The Yeomen of the Guard as Sir Richard Cholmondoley; H.M.S. Pinafore as Captain Corcoran; The Mikado as Pish-Tush; and his earlier roles in Patience, Iolanthe, and The Gondoliers. He appeared in other operettas: as Harry Sherwood in Dorothy, and Franz von Schober in Lilac Time. The Australian season ended at Adelaide in May 1933, and the company left for South Africa; they returned in April 1935 The season ended in May 1937 in Melbourne, with Iolanthe, followed by The Chocolate Soldier, Stroud playing Bumerli, which, though written for a tenor, had already been successfully played by baritones Leslie Gaze and C. H. Workman.

He returned to England, where he won the part of Pish Tush in the film version of The Mikado. He had a minor role in the comedy/thriller Q Planes starring Laurence Olivier and Ralph Richardson. His stage appearances included Beatrix Thomson's Sons of Adam in March 1939.

Stroud returned to Australia and the JCW organization for the 1940-41 G&S tour, taking the parts of Sir Marmaduke Pointdextre in The Sorcerer, the Earl of Mountararat in Iolanthe, and the Lieutenant of the Tower in The Yeomen of the Guard, and his accustomed roles in H.M.S. Pinafore, Princess Ida, The Mikado, Patience and The Gondoliers, followed by revivals of Patience and The Mikado (his first as Poo-Bah) and other musical comedies: Lilac Time, as Dr Scharntorff; Night Birds, as Dr Falke; The Maid of the Mountains, as Beppo; and a minor role in The Merry Widow, both starring Gladys Moncrieff, also troop concerts and charity functions, in the intervening years.

His last Gilbert and Sullivan season began in Brisbane in July 1944 at His Majesty's Theatre, with The Gondoliers, The Pirates of Penzance, The Yeomen of the Guard, and The Mikado, followed by Melbourne with The Gondoliers, The Pirates of Penzance, Patience, Iolanthe, HMS Pinafore, Ruddigore, Princess Ida, The Mikado and Gondoliers again. The Desert Song rounded off the Melbourne season, with Stroud's playing Baldassare, the brigand chief. The Desert Song season, and Stroud's professional career, ended farcically when Stroud and Gladys Moncrieff stepped forward to take a bow, and a piece of scenery fell on them, though neither was hurt.

In 1946 Stroud and Alex H. Doig took the lease of "Hollywood Pleasure Grounds" in Cabra-vale for five years at £10 per week. From around 1948 Doig was sole lessee. Stroud maintained a presence in the Sydney suburb of Fairfield as guest vocalist and master of ceremonies at public functions.

His association with Gilbert and Sullivan was not over: in 1955 he acted as producer for the Sydney Musical Society's production of Iolanthe, Later that year he produced The Yeomen of the Guard for the Muswellbrook branch of the Arts Council. From the mid-1950s until the late 1960s he produced annual Gilbert and Sullivan musicals for the local Arts Council in Tamworth.

== Television ==
The National Archives of Australia has records of his appearing in the television series Bellbird, along with many other actors of greater or less celebrity, (Briony Behets, Charles Tingwell, Peter Whitford . . .) but not recorded elsewhere.

== Recordings ==
Katja, the Dancer (Note: Katja, the Dancer is an English-language operetta by Harry Graham and Frederick Lonsdale developed from Katja die Tänzerin by Leopold Jacobson and Rudolph Österreicher, music by Jean Gilbert.) Columbia 3625–3628 set of four 10-inch discs includes the songs:

- "Just For a Night" duet with Lilian Davies (soprano)
- "I've Planned a Rendezvous"
- "If You Cared" duet with Ivy Tresmand
- "Those Eyes So Tender" duet with Lilian Davies (soprano)

== Personal ==
No record has been found of any family, sports, hobbies or other interests.
