= George Musgrove =

English-born Australian theatre producer (1854–1916)

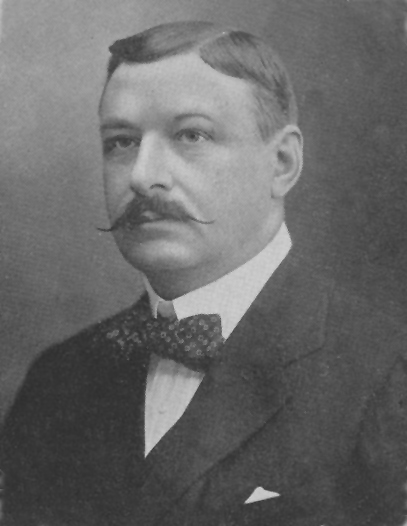
- Born: 21 January 1854; Surbiton, England
- Died: 21 January 1916 (aged 62); Sydney, Australia
- Occupation: Theatre producer
- Years active: 1880–1916

George Musgrove (21 January 1854 – 21 January 1916) was an English-born Australian theatre producer.

== Early life ==
Musgrove was born at Surbiton, England, the son of Thomas John Watson Musgrove, an accountant, and his wife, Fanny Hodson, an actress and sister of Georgiana Rosa Hodson who married William Saurin Lyster. Fanny's brother was composer, singer and comedian George Alfred Hodson, the father of Henrietta Hodson. Musgrove married Emily Fisk Knight at All Saints Church, St Kilda, on 1 August 1874.

== Opera and theatre career ==
He, J. C. Williamson, and Arthur Garner formed the Williamson, Garner and Musgrove company in July 1882 when they became joint lessees of the Theatre Royal, Melbourne and Theatre Royal, Sydney. The partnership split in March 1890 following Williamson and Musgrove falling out.

Williamson and Garner continued to run the Theatre Royal and Princess Theatre in Melbourne, with Musgrove taking control of the Theatre Royal in Sydney. At the end of 1892, Williamson and Musgrove joined to stage the pantomime Little Red Riding Hood, which opened a new "Lyceum" theatre on Pitt Street, Sydney.

In 1902–03, he presented Nellie Melba in her first and most successful concert tour of Australia and New Zealand, managed by Thomas P. Hudson.

In 1907 Musgrove produced a German grand opera company that introduced Die Walküre (The Valkyrie), Romeo and Juliet and Hänsel und Gretel to the Australian public, again under the baton of Gustave Slapoffski. Another opera season in 1909 was less successful. In late 1914 Musgrove produced David Belasco's play Du Barry in Melbourne with his lover Nellie Stewart in the title role as well as their daughter, Nancye Stewart, as Marie Antoinette, age 16.

Musgrove died suddenly at his home in Sydney on 21 January 1916, his sixty-second birthday.

== Personality and family ==
Musgrove was reputed to value artistic quality over profitability. Musgrove's marriage produced two daughters, Emily Musgrove and Rose Musgrove, an actress in comedies and Edwardian musical comedies. His eldest daughter, Lily Musgrove, married Melbourne barrister Casimir Zichy-Woinarski in 1898. His third daughter, Nancye Doris Stewart, was also known as Nancye Doris Lynton, (1893–1973), the child of his lover, actress and singer Nellie Stewart.

His brother Harry Musgrove (c. 1861 – 2 November 1931) was also involved in theatre management. He had two sons, Harry and Victor, and a daughter, actress Georgie Musgrove. Harry George Musgrove (c. 1883 – 27 April 1951) who, with E. J. Carroll and Dan Carroll, founded the magnificent Prince Edward Theatre on Castlereagh Street, Sydney, later bankrupt.

== Legacy ==
Musgrove Opera, an opera company which bears his name, was founded in Sydney in 2018. The company debuted at the Zenith Theatre, Chatswood with a production of "Pinocchio!" which subsequently toured to South Coast NSW. More recently, the company has performed a series of concerts in the Utzon Room at the Sydney Opera House. Australian conductor Lachlan Massey acts as its founding Artistic director.
