= Gustave Slapoffski =

English musician

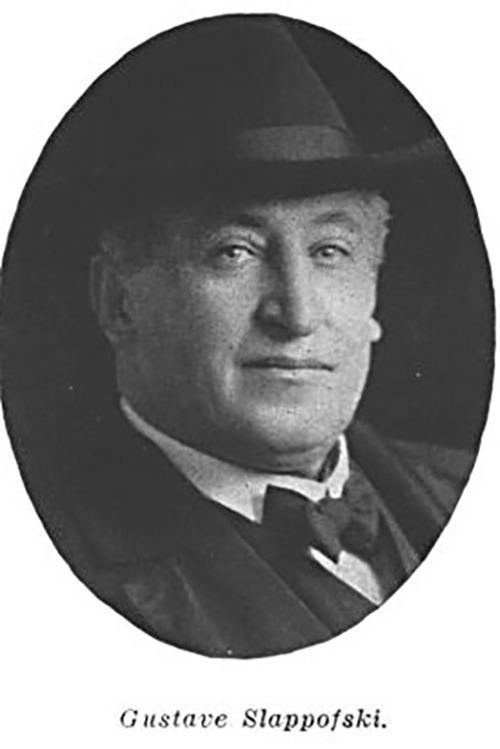
Gustave Slapoffski

Gustave Slapoffski (20 August 1862 – 3 August 1951) was an English musician who performed as a violinist and conductor in Britain for two decades, followed by a conducting and film scoring career in Australia over the next three decades.

The son of a violinist, Slapoffski graduated the Royal Academy of Music in 1879 and began his own career as a violinist in the British provinces and then at London theatres, where he was eventually first violin in the orchestra at the Opera Comique and then with the Carl Rosa Opera Company. By the mid 1890s, he was assistant conductor for Carl Rosa and, in 1897, became principal conductor. In 1900, together with his second wife, Carl Rosa soprano Lillian Williams, he moved to Australia to conduct opera for George Musgrove. He also conducted tours and performances of such notable performers as Nellie Melba.

During the First World War, Slapoffski wrote the scores to accompany the action on screen during silent films and conducted the orchestras. Through the 1920s, he conducted seasons of opera and Gilbert and Sullivan for J. C. Williamson and continued to conduct into the 1930s.

== Early life ==
He was born in 1862 in London as Joseph Gustavus Slapoffski, the son of Adolph Slapoffski (1827–1902), a Polish-born violinist and musician, who was probably of Jewish descent. Neither of his wives was Jewish. After his first wife Elizabeth Jane Hunter (1832–1857) died in childbirth Adolph married her sister, Anne née Hunter (1837–1926), who was Gustave Slapoffski's mother. Anne, like her sister, was born in Sydney, Australia, where her father, British Army major William Hunter, was the military secretary to Sir Richard Bourke, Governor of New South Wales. Baptised on 2 October 1875 at All Souls Church in Marylebone, London, Slapoffski grew up in Oxford, where he attended Christ Church Cathedral School. He was an amateur boxer and learned to play the violin with such success that in 1876 Prince Leopold, the youngest son of Queen Victoria and Prince Albert, arranged for his admission to the Royal Academy of Music in London, where he received tuition in violin from the French violinist Prosper Sainton and studied composition under Arthur Sullivan. Later in life, Slapoffski would claim that he had some association with the original productions of Gilbert and Sullivan's The Sorcerer (1876) and H.M.S. Pinafore (1878).

== Career ==
=== Early years in Britain ===
On graduating from the Royal Academy in 1879 Slapoffski toured the British provinces as a violin soloist and played in the orchestra for the first London production of Offenbach's Madame Favart at the Strand Theatre (1879) before a period as first violin in the orchestra at the Opera Comique in London. Slapoffski married Charlotte Barrett (1863–1896) on 4 October 1881 at All Saints Church in Oxford, where the first two of their children were born. In total they were to have eight children: Adolph William Frank Prosper Slapoffski (1882–1902); Anne Hunter Slapoffski (1884–1964); Charlotte "Lottie" Douglas Slapoffski (1885–1969); Gustave Slapoffski, Jnr (1887–1932); Robert Slapoffski (1888–1914); Lola Slapoffski (born 1892); Claude Leo Slapoffski (1894–1961), who served in the Australian Army during World War I; and Mary Slapoffski (1896–1933).

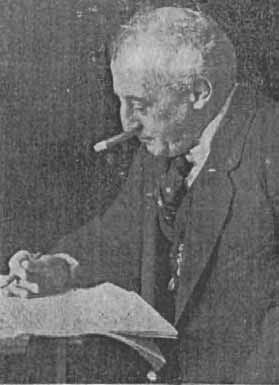
Slapoffski at work, c. 1920

Nicknamed "Slap", Slapoffski was appointed musical director at the Princess Theatre in Manchester before becoming orchestra leader and first violin with the Carl Rosa Opera Company, for whom he was also assistant conductor, taking part in British tours of Jeanie Deans (1894); The Flying Dutchman (1895); Carmen (1895) and Tannhäuser (1896). A Freemason, in 1894 Slapoffski joined the Lodge of Emulation No. 1505. His right arm was virtually paralysed from his career as a violinist necessitating his conducting with his left. In early 1897 he was still playing as well as conducting for Carl Rosa in a season at the Garrick Theatre when they presented Godard's La vivandière, Roméo et Juliette, Faust, Tannhäuser, Lohengrin, Mignon and Die Meistersinger among other works.

By October 1897 Slapoffski was principal conductor during Carl Rosa's short season at the Royal Opera House that included The Bohemian Girl. In 1899 he conducted for Carl Rosa's British tour of Faust, Il trovatore, The Bohemian Girl and Three Musketeers. Following on from this success, in 1900 the conductor Hans Richter suggested Slapoffski to the Australian theatre producer George Musgrove as a suitable musical director for a forthcoming season of opera in Australia.

=== Move to Australia ===
Slapoffski went to Australia with his second wife, the soprano Elizabeth "Lillian" Frances Williams (c. 1877–1952), who had appeared with Carl Rosa. The couple would stay in Australia for the rest of their lives. During that 1900 season Slapoffski conducted performances in Melbourne, Sydney, Adelaide and New Zealand including the Australian premières of Tannhäuser, Lohengrin and The Flying Dutchman. His wife sang Elsa in Lohengrin and Marguerite in Faust, to critical acclaim. In May 1901 Slapoffski conducted a concert to celebrate the inaugural meeting of the Parliament of Australia when it was first convened in the Royal Exhibition Building in Melbourne. The 1901 British census records that Slapoffski's children were being looked after by his father Adolph and his wife in Oxford. Once he decided to stay in Australia, Slapoffski sent for his children who, accompanied by Adolph and his wife, joined Slapoffski and Lillian in East Melbourne.

In 1902 Slapoffski was the conductor of a 50-piece orchestra for Nellie Melba's Australian tour, and in 1903 he conducted The Fortune Teller for Musgrove, in which Lillian appeared as Musette, the title role. This led to a falling out between Slapoffski and Musgrove over his wife's salary during the run, which ended up in court. In 1906 while his wife was touring the United States Slapoffski and Musgrove were there separately with Nellie Stewart in Sweet Nell of Old Drury. Although the tour was a great success in San Francisco, California, the 1906 San Francisco earthquake compelled the company to abandon the tour stop in New York as the scenery for the repertoire season was destroyed. While Stewart returned to Australia Slapoffski and Musgrove went to Germany to audition singers for the 1907 opera season in Australia for Musgrove's Royal Grand Opera Company, which included Die Walküre, Roméo et Juliette and Hänsel und Gretel under Slapoffski's baton. In the following years Slapoffski was the conductor for the Sydney Amateur Orchestral Society and the Sydney Symphony Orchestra, among others, and acted as the musical director for various international singers during their appearances in Australia.

During the First World War, American silent films from Hollywood were shown in Australia under the J. C. Williamson banner in place of the live performances that were no longer taking place in theatres. Slapoffski wrote the scores to accompany the action on the screen and also conducted the orchestras. When the 1915 film Madame Butterfly (1915) was shown with Mary Pickford as Cho Cho San Slapoffski conducted selections from Puccini's opera Madama Butterfly while his wife sang "One Fine Day" and "The Garden of My Heart". He conducted the orchestra to accompany a showing of The Birth of a Nation. Slapoffski was a foundation Council member of the New South Wales State Conservatorium of Music, where his wife taught voice from 1916 to 1928. In 1919 Slapoffski was made an Associate of the Royal Academy of Music in London.

== Later years ==
Slapoffski was musical director of J. C. Williamson's seasons of grand opera from 1919 to 1922 and for Williamson's successful seasons of Gilbert and Sullivan operas in 1920, 1926–27 and 1931–32. In 1925–26 he was musical director of the New Zealand and South Seas International Exhibition in Dunedin, while in March 1931 he conducted 3,000 singers and 500 instrumentalists in a memorial concert for Dame Nellie Melba at the Adelaide Oval. During the mid-1930s he was a supporter of the National Theatre Movement, established in 1935 to provide training and performing opportunities for Australian artists.

Slapoffski died in August 1951, aged 88, at Windsor, Melbourne, and was cremated.
