= Ivan Menzies =

British singer and actor

Ivan Menzies as Ko-Ko in The Mikado, c. 1925

James Ivan "Jimmy" Menzies (1896 – 19 April 1985) was an English singer and actor, best known for his performances in the comic baritone roles of the Savoy Operas with the D'Oyly Carte Opera Company in Britain in the 1920s and the J. C. Williamson Gilbert & Sullivan Opera Company in Australia the 1930s and 1940s.

Menzies married a D'Oyly Carte principal soprano, Elsie Griffin, but he left her repeatedly to go on extensive tours in Australia and New Zealand. Later, Menzies became a leader of the Moral Re-Armament movement in Australia and Britain, and he continued to perform on stage until 1962.

== Life and career ==
Ivan Menzies was born in Worksop, England, the son of a medical doctor. He served on the Western Front in World War I before shattering his right arm and thigh in the Battle of the Somme on 8 August 1916. He served in the King's Own Royal Lancaster Regiment. In 2014 a love letter came to light that was sent to him, on Valentine's Day in 1916, as preparations were under way for the Battle of the Somme. The sender was a French woman named Eleonore Aneelle, a cafe owner's daughter from the Somme village of Berteaucourt-les-Dames. After his injury, Menzies performed in concert parties for the rest of the war.

=== Early career ===
Menzies joined the D'Oyly Carte Opera Company as a chorister in 1921, soon playing small Gilbert and Sullivan roles in the company's second touring company, including the Associate in Trial by Jury, First Citizen in The Yeomen of the Guard and Antonio in The Gondoliers and sometimes joining the organisation's main repertory company. In 1923, Menzies added the role of Major Murgatroyd in Patience to his regular repertory. The same year, over the protests of her family, Menzies married D'Oyly Carte soprano star Elsie Griffin. They had one daughter, Mahala.

During these early seasons, Menzies understudied Henry Lytton, Leo Sheffield and other principal comedians of the company and appeared occasionally in the leading comedy roles of the Learned Judge in Trial, Major General Stanley in The Pirates of Penzance, the Lord Chancellor in Iolanthe, Jack Point in Yeomen, and the Duke of Plaza-Toro in The Gondoliers. Menzies related that "The first time I played the Duke of Plaza-Toro, I started by catching my spurs and falling into the canal. It was decidedly not traditional."

In the secondary touring company, Menzies became the principal comedian in 1925, playing Reginald Bunthorne in Patience, Lord Chancellor, Ko-Ko in The Mikado, Robin Oakapple in Ruddigore, Major General Stanley and the Duke of Plaza Toro. In 1927, with the closing of the secondary touring company, Menzies left D'Oyly Carte. He then appeared with Macdonald & Young's company in Happy Go Lucky, and, in 1928, at the Lyric Theatre, Hammersmith in Love in a Village.

=== J. C. Williamson and Moral Re-Armament ===
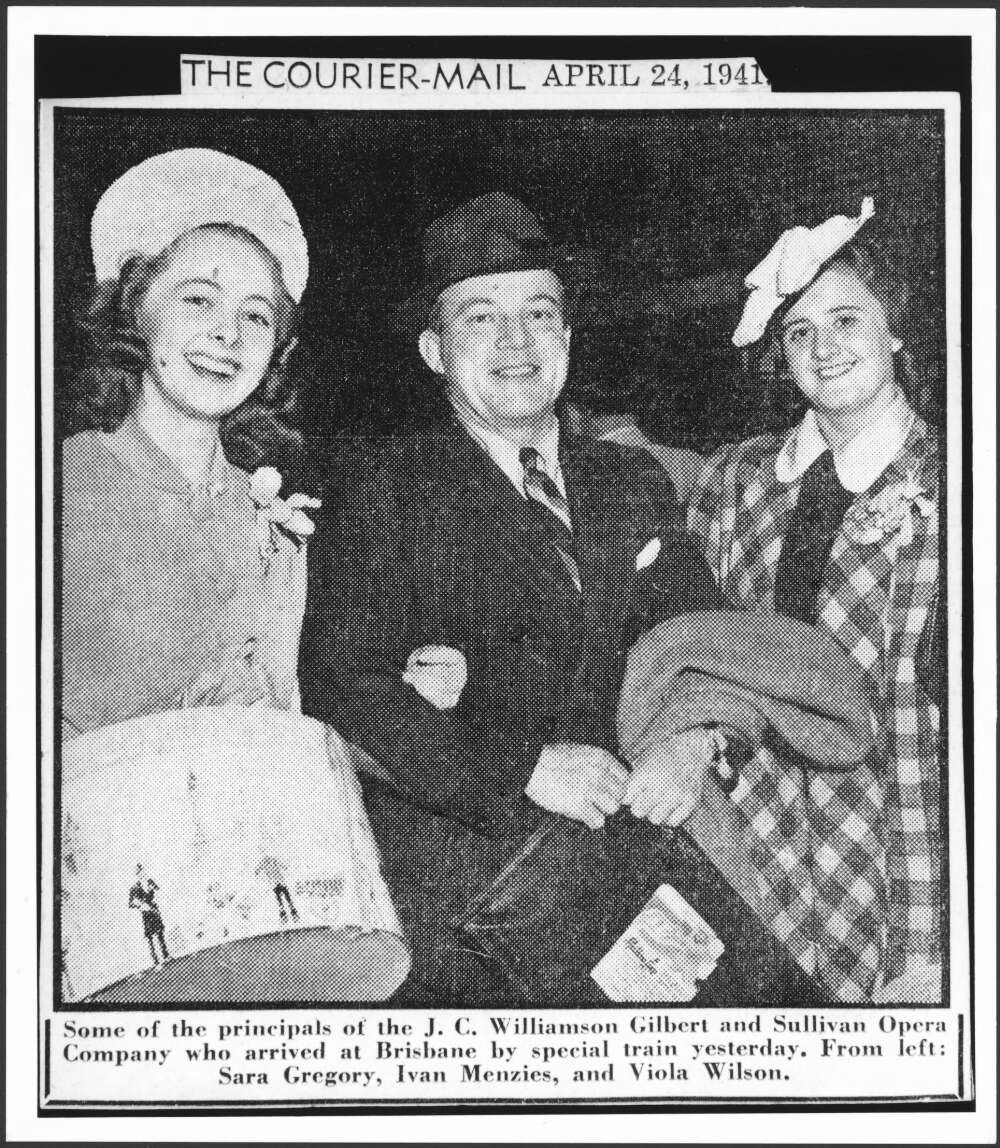
Menzies in Australia, 1941, with J. C. Williamson actresses

In 1931, Menzies joined the J. C. Williamson Gilbert and Sullivan company in Australia. He toured extensively with that company as Sir Joseph Porter in H.M.S. Pinafore, General Stanley, Bunthorne, the Lord Chancellor, Ko-Ko, Jack Point, the Duke of Plaza Toro and the Learned Judge, leaving Griffin and his infant daughter in England while carrying on extra-marital affairs in Australia. Menzies was not a generous performer, and he was notorious for hogging the spotlight and making demands upon Williamson's managers.

Back in Britain in 1934, he met Peggy Williams from the Oxford Group, later known as the Moral Re-Armament, a Christian movement founded at Oxford in the 1920s. Williams persuaded Menzies to join the movement, and he resolved to change his life, adopting the group's so-called four absolutes: honesty, purity, unselfishness and love. He aggressively proselytized for the movement by giving lectures, when not performing onstage. When he returned for another Australian tour, he insultingly said that God had called him "to pioneer in a country that had never known a major spiritual awakening".

In September 1939, at the outbreak of World War II, the British government ordered all theatres to close. Rupert D'Oyly Carte cancelled the company's autumn tour and terminated the contracts of his performers. When the company started up again at Christmas 1939, the company's principal comedian, Martyn Green, had accepted another engagement. Carte hired Grahame Clifford to play Green's roles. Carte engaged Menzies to return to England and the company to share some of the principal comedian roles with Clifford for two months until Clifford could be trained in all the roles and could settle in. Menzies appeared as Sir Joseph, General Stanley, the Lord Chancellor, Ko-Ko, and (occasionally) the Duke of Plaza Toro, before leaving the company in February 1940. He was in Australia and New Zealand again as principal comedian in the J. C. Williamson G&S tours in 1941, 1944, 1949, and 1951.

=== Later years ===
Later, Menzies and Griffin (who never divorced) appeared in the Moral Re-Armament musical, The Vanishing Island, in which they toured around the world from 1955 until 1957. In 1962, Griffin's singing career was ended by a throat operation; Menzies had a heart attack the same year. They spent most of their remaining years living quietly in the London suburb of Barnes, although they continued to participate in Moral Re-Armament activities. In 1975, during the D'Oyly Carte Opera Company's centennial season, Menzies was invited to participate in the final performance of Trial by Jury, in which the company's regular chorus was augmented by fourteen former stars of the company.

Menzies died in Blackheath, London at the age of 89.
