= John Ralston (baritone) =

Australian baritone

John Morgan Ralston (c. 1881 – 17 April 1933) was an Australian baritone (or perhaps bass-baritone) singer noted for his work in musical comedies and Gilbert and Sullivan operas.

== Biography ==
Ralston was born in Brisbane, the second son of John Ralston (died 1908), a marine pilot. He began singing as a boy soprano at St Mary's (Anglican) Church, Kangaroo Point, Brisbane in 1894

He began acting with Pollard's Lilliputian Opera Company, led by Tom "Pollard" Sullivan, which toured Australasia and the East with considerable success until its disbandment in 1905 in Perth after a tour of South Africa (during which he married the company's danseuse). It was when he was engaged with this company that he came to the attention of J. C. Williamson, with whose Light Opera Company he remained the rest of his life; he appeared in operettas, particularly in Gilbert and Sullivan. His most memorable part came in 1924 when he played Franz Schubert in the Sydney premiere of Lilac Time and made it his own as far as Australia was concerned.

Though only 51 years old and having a magnificent physique, Ralston suffered from poor health and was forced to stand down due to heart problems during tours of North Queensland and New Zealand. He traveled with the company to Perth and played, to great effect, The Grand Inquisitor in The Gondoliers, The Sergeant in The Pirates of Penzance and Pooh Bah in The Mikado and was scheduled for the company's production of Lilac Time, but was unable to take his place on stage. He died in a private hospital in Perth and was buried in this city.

== Family ==
He married actress Rose "Rosie" Evesson, youngest daughter of Charles Evesson of Woollahra, New South Wales, in Durban, South Africa on 22 October 1903. They had three daughters, the first two were both actresses:

- Edna Ralston worked as an actress in the U.S., and returned around 1930. She later advertised as a ladies' hairdresser. She is reported as marrying a violinist of the Melba company, but confirmation of this has proved elusive. After her father's death, she lived with her mother.
- (Marie) Mascotte Ralston (19 September 1906 – 23 November 1988) was an actress and swimmer who made third place in the Miss Australia Contest in 1926. She married drummer and bandleader Phil Harris (1904–1995) of Nashville in 1927. They divorced in 1940. She appeared in movies as Marcia Ralston
- Pauline Jeanette Ralston married Norman Robert Barlow on 9 May 1936.

Their home was 26 Canterbury Road, St Kilda, Victoria. Mrs Ralston later lived with daughter Edna at 137 Ormond Road, Elwood, Victoria.

== Selected parts ==
- Florodora
- Katinka
- Lilac Time as Franz Schubert
- Waltz Dream

Gilbert and Sullivan

- The Gondoliers as the Grand Inquisitor
- H.M.S. Pinafore as Captain Corcoran
- Iolanthe as Strephon
- The Mikado as Poo Bah and Pish Tush
- Patience as Archibald Grosvenor
- The Pirates of Penzance as the Sergeant of Police
- Princess Ida as King Hildebrand
- Ruddigore as Sir Despard
- The Yeomen of the Guard as Wilfred Shadbolt

Australian compositions

- The Marriage Market featuring Heroes of the Dardanelles by Reginald Stoneham
