= Her Majesty's Theatre, Brisbane =

Demolished building in Brisbane, Queensland

Coordinates: 27.4692°S 153.0264°E

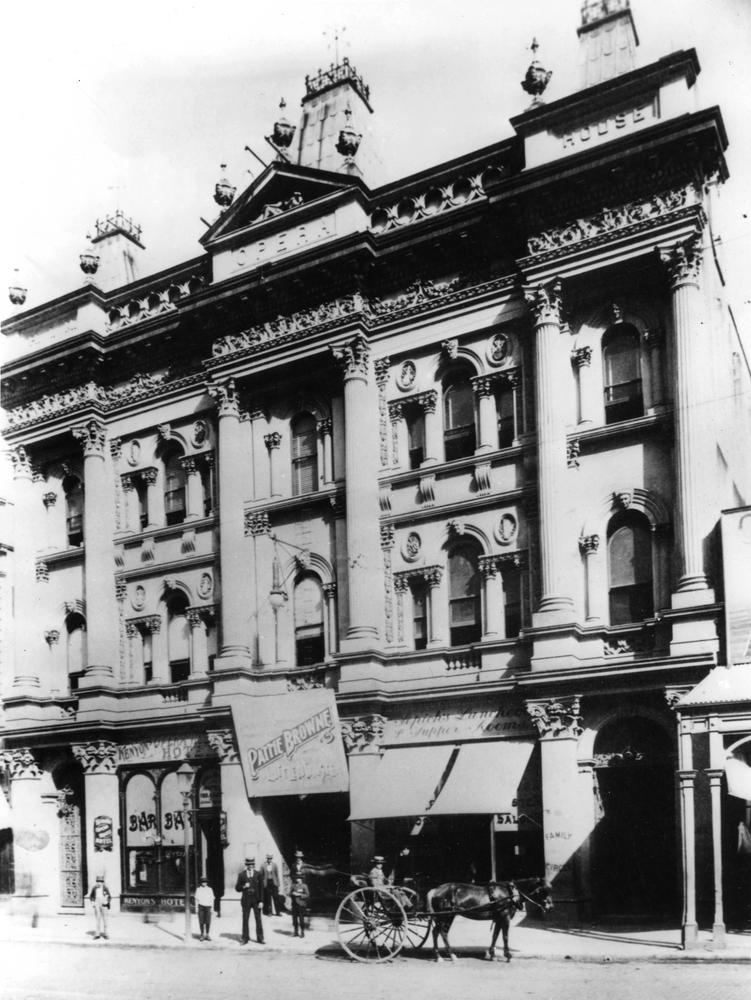
Facade of Her Majestys Theatre c. 1898

Her Majesty's Theatre was a theatre in Brisbane, Queensland, Australia, between 1888 and 1983. It opened as Her Imperial Majesty's Opera House on 2 April 1888, and was known as His Majesty's Theatre between 1901 and until at least 1957, despite Queen Elizabeth II's reign commencing in 1952. The largest theatre in Brisbane, it was located at 193 Queen Street. Its façade was in the Italian Renaissance and Corinthian style.

The building was demolished in October 1983, when the Wintergarden shopping centre was expanded.

== History of the property ==
The property was originally owned by Byrne Hart. It was leased to C.H. Homes and Harold Ashton. It was later sold to the AMP Society in 1973. With the closure of the Winter Garden Theatre, a nearby cinema in 1973, Her Majesty's seemed the next likely candidate for sale and redevelopment.

The Queensland Government began to plan in the 1970s for an arts precinct in Brisbane, which would ultimately become the Queensland Cultural Centre. Her Majesty's was the only Brisbane theatre with a stage large enough to accommodate the scenery and staging requirements of a number of touring productions. The need for a large stage to possibly replace this kind of theatre would lead to the development of the Queensland Performing Arts Centre at South Bank.

The final performance at the theatre was the Lord Mayor's Command Performance on 16 October 1983. The building was demolished on 23 October 1983, when the Wintergarden shopping centre was expanded to include the Hilton Hotel.

== Architect and interior design ==
The original theatre was designed by Italian born architect Andrea Stombuco and son. Stombuco designed a number of Brisbane's buildings in and around Brisbane. The chief builders were O'Keefe and Company and James Lang and Company were responsible for decorative features. In 1929, the theatre was modernised, rebuilt and reopened. Cedric Ballantyne and George McLeish were the architects of this project.

The theatre was three storeys, and was 66 feet wide, 248 feet deep with a 60 by 63 foot stage.

The earliest theatre included a hotel providing a public bar and tobacconist. The entry to the stalls and pit were via a fountain decorated with satyrs and other female figures. The auditorium ceiling was decorated with a number of cornices featuring egg and dart, chain and bead and other features. The cornices were decorated in rose, shamrock and thistle designs in green, salmon, blue and gold. Each side of the stage featured a pillar decorated in gold accents.

Seats in the Dress Circle were in maroon velvet, as was the stage curtain. Stall seating was wooden chairs. Asbestos fire proof paint was used in the scenery, backstage and wings area to reduce the risk of fire. Ventilation was provided by air forced through earthenware pipes. The ceiling was designed to assist hot air to dissipate via a sliding section which was added to the theatre in 1901 by architect, William Pitt. The 1920 remodel of the theatre provided for additional seating, with the removal of the gallery and old dress circle. Another series of renovations occurred in 1941. Dressing rooms for performers were hot particularly in Brisbane summers.

== Seating ==
The main auditorium could seat 1,911 people. This included dress circle, private boxes, stall and gallery seating.

== Productions ==
The chief productions at the theatre were initially opera. In 1901 alone, 29 different opera productions were offered at Her Majesty's. Four theatre companies produced plays at the theatre. The theatre was the largest in Brisbane. J.C. Williamson's company held the lease on the theatre for over 80 years. Films were also shown there.

== Famous performers ==
- Dame Clara Butt, a British contralto sang at a concert at His Majesty's in 1925
- Anna Pavlova and her ballet company toured in the 1920s
- Ignacy Paderewski, the polish pianist toured in 1928
- Nellie Melba and Gladys Moncrieff
- Sir Laurence Olivier and Vivien Leigh performed at the theatre in 1948
- Bob Dyer
- Dame Sybil Thorndike brought her company to perform there in 1932

The final performance at the theatre was the Lord Mayor's Command Performance on 16 October 1983, which featured Australian and English performers, compered by Bobby Limb. Performers included Margaret Noonan, Brian Doyle, Barry Crocker, Reg Varney and Johnny Young.

== Demolition ==
With the redevelopment of Queen Street in Brisbane's Central Business District to become a closed pedestrian mall following the 1982 Commonwealth Games, Her Majesty's was earmarked for demolition by the Kern Corporation. Despite community protest, the theatre was demolished on 23 October 1983 to make way for the Hilton Hotel and Wintergarden shopping centre in Brisbane's Central Business District. A Union ban on site over the preservation of the façade of the theatre caused delays. Despite assurances that the façade would be incorporated into the new building, demolition work destroyed the entire complex.

== Plans of the building ==
Plans of the theatre are held at State Library of Queensland.

Selected programmes from productions performed at the theatre are held in the University of Queensland Fryer Library.
