= The Lorgnette =

Weekly magazine in Melbourne, Australia

The Lorgnette, subtitled "Theatrical Journal and Programme" (later "A journal for Amusements"), was a weekly magazine in Melbourne, Australia, devoted to theatre, opera and the concert stage. The magazine was published Saturdays and sold for 2d (two pence) at the major entertainment venues (Theatre Royal, Opera House, Academy of Music, Princess' Theatre, St George's Hall and Town Hall) where it had exclusive rights, and elsewhere.

For much of its existence, a four-page supplement was issued with the Saturday two pence (from 1890 one penny) paper. The supplement was available gratis as a separate publication every other day of the week. This supplement was printed (and contents updated) daily, and datestamped.

In order to promote forthcoming productions as well as providing up-to-date theatre news and current programmes, a great deal of its content was reprinted from one issue to the next, perhaps a unique characteristic of this magazine, while some features changed with every issue, notably the illustrated biographies, a list of which forms a large part of this article.

== History ==
A sheet called The Lorgnette made its first appearance in Melbourne in July 1865, "a local Punch" without pictures" and was hailed by The Argus for its "considerable spirit".

In April 1877, following a complaint from Joseph Alfred Hildreth, publisher of rival theatrical paper L'Entracte, John J. Liddy, publisher of "The Lorgnette" at Royal lane, off 106 Bourke Street east, was fined £5 with £2 2s. costs for having an unregistered press and types in his possession.

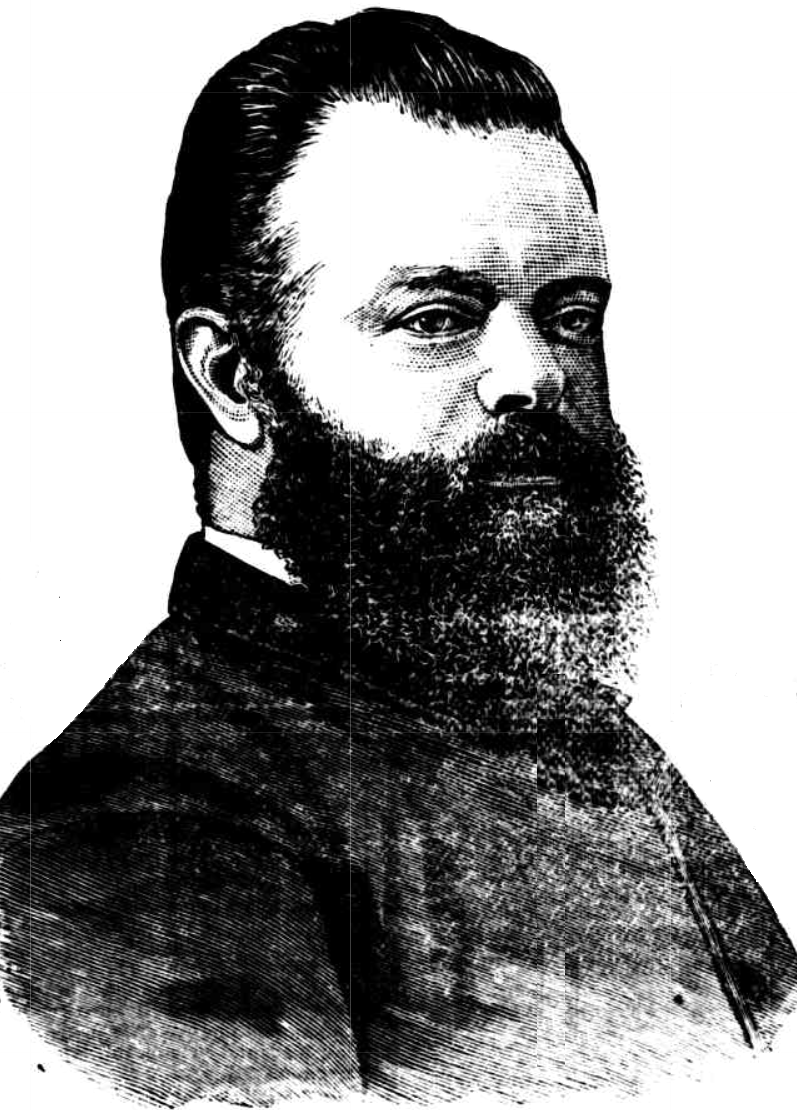
William Marshall

In 1878 William Marshall, of Melbourne's The Record and Emerald Hill and Sandridge Advertiser ("The Record") newspaper, with printing works at Emerald Hill, purchased The Lorgnette and its printery, and continued running both businesses. Marshall divested himself of The Record in 1881.

The printing works was adjacent the Bijou Theatre, Melbourne, which was destroyed by fire in April 1889. Marshall suffered significant losses as did the Brough-Boucicault Comedy Company, lessees of the theatre. Members of the acting community put on a benefit performance for Marshall, which raised £582. Those involved included George Coppin, the Majeronis, J. C. Williamson, Richard Stewart, Grattan Riggs, Fred Maccabe, Alfred Dampier, Henry Harwood, and Bland Holt.

A feature of issues from 11 May 1889 to 6 December 1890 was a biography of a prominent artist, accompanied by a photo-engraved (perhaps leggotype) portrait, a list of which appears below.

In January 1889 Marshall purchased Fred E. Patey's interest in the Theatrical Courier and henceforth the Lorgnette was subtitled "With which is incorporated The Theatrical Courier".

11 May 1889 saw the first of the weekly series of biographies which continued to December 1890.

17 January 1891 was the last (Saturday) weekly issue at 1d. It was followed with an issue labelled "4th Series No. 1" dated 18 January, and was supplied gratis. It appears that, as with the Supplements mentioned above, fresh issues with updates could have been printed every day.

John Liddy, who maintained a personal (if not financial) interest in the paper, died in January 1891

In 1898 William Marshall & Co. moved from Royal Lane to new premises at 229 Little Collins Street (just above Swanston Street. The old premises had been condemned as unfit in 1895 and again in 1896. Marshall died on 12 June 1900, aged 55, fondly remembered by the theatre community.

== The Lorgnette biographies ==
Date	Name	aka	
1889 05 11	Miss Isabel Morris		UK actress
1889 05 11	Dion Boucicault Jr.		IRE manager
1889 05 11	Robert Brough		UK actor manager
1889 05 18	Alfred Dampier		UK actor manager
1889 05 25	Grattan Riggs	Thomas G. Riggs	US actor
1889 06 01	George S. Coppin		UK actor manager
1889 06 08	Philip Beck	Phil Beck	UK actor
1889 06 15	Miss Myra Kemble	Mrs J. H. White	AUS actress
1889 06 22	Fred Maccabe	Fred McCabe	UK standup comic Married Mdlle Minnia
1889 06 29	Eduardo Majeroni		ITA actor manager
1889 07 06	Thomas P. Hudson		UK entertainer / manager
1889 07 13	Miss Maggie Knight		AUS actress Married H. R. Jewett
1889 07 20	Harry Lynch	Lynch Family bellringers	AUS bellringer
1889 07 27	Miss Emma Chambers	Mrs Albert Marsh (1889–)	UK actress manager
1889 08 03	Arthur Garner	member, "The Triumvirate"	AUS manager
1889 08 10	G. H. Snazelle		UK entertainer
1889 08 17	Miss Janet Achurch		UK actress
1889 08 24	Miss Jennie Lee		UK actress Married J. P. Burnett
1889 08 31	Signora Majeroni	niece of Ristori	ITA actress
1889 09 07	George Fawcett Rowe	George Fawcett	AUS actor
1889 09 14	The Royal Midgets	General Mite; Mrs Mite; Francis J. Flynn (died in Broken Hill November 1898)	entertainers
1889 09 21	Edward Armes Beaumont	Armes Beaumont	AUS operatic tenor
1889 09 28	Henry Edwards		UK actor
1889 10 05	Wybert Reeve		UK actor playwright
1889 10 12	Edwin F. Thorne		US actor Note that a correction to the filename is pending at WM Commons
1889 10 19	Miss Edith Blande		UK actress married critic, stage biographer Austin Brereton (1862–1922)
1889 10 26	Miss Olive Berkley		US child actress born Olivia Venetia Berkley in New York, 1879, played Little Lord Fauntleroy
1889 11 02	Martin Simonsen		AUS violinist manager
1889 11 09	Henry Bracy		UK light opera
1889 11 16	Miss Elsa May	Elcia May	AUS operatic prima donna Married Boothroyd Fairclough
1889 11 23	Frank Thornton		UK comedian
1889 11 30	Miss Lilian Tree		UK operatic singer
1889 12 07	Knight Aston		UK light opera
1889 12 14	George Sutton Titheradge		UK actor
1889 12 21	W. G. Carey		AUS actor
1889 12 28	Miss Lily Dampier	daughter of Alfred	UK actress
1890 01 04	Madame Fanny Simonsen		FRA operatic prima donna
1890 01 11	Charles Warner		UK actor
1890 01 18	James Allison		AUS stage manager
1890 01 25	Miss Fanny Wiseman	Mrs William South	UK actress
1890 02 01	James F. Cathcart		UK actor
1890 02 08	Mrs Robert Brough	Florence Trevelyan	AUS actress
1890 02 15	George R. Ireland		AUS actor
1890 02 22	Benjamin N. Jones		US stage manager
1890 03 01	Mrs Brown-Potter		US actress
1890 03 08	Miss Gracie Warner		UK actress
1890 03 15	John Lawrence Toole		UK comedian
1890 03 22	Madame Marian Burton		UK opera singer
1890 03 29	George Darrell		AUS actor author
1890 04 05	George William Anson		UK actor
1890 04 12	Percy Lyndal		UK actor
1890 04 19	Miss Pattie Browne		AUS actress Married W. Baumann
1890 04 26	John Billington		UK actor
1890 05 03	Jules Simonsen		AUS light opera
1890 05 10	Alexander Mayne		AUS manager recitations
1890 05 17	Sir Charles Hallé		UK pianist
1890 05 24	Henry R. Harwood		UK comedian
1890 05 31	Dion Boucicault		IRE actor
1890 06 07	Miss Jenny Watt-Tanner		AUS actress
1890 06 14	Cecil Ward		AUS actor
1890 06 21	Professor S. S. Baldwin		US entertainer
1890 06 28	George Rignold		UK actor
1890 07 05	Mrs Bland Holt	Florence Anderson	UK actress manager
1890 07 12	William Rignold		UK actor
1890 07 19	Miss Maude Williamson		UK actress
1890 07 26	Cecil Forrester		AUS actor
1890 08 02	Miss Roland Watts-Phillips		UK actress
1890 08 09	Edward Sass		UK actor
1890 08 16	A. E. Greenaway		AUS actor
1890 08 23	Kyrle Bellew		UK actor Married Eugenie Le Grande
1890 08 30	A. Litherland Cunard		UK stage manager
1890 09 06	Christine Darrell		AUS actress
1890 09 13	George Leopold		UK comedian
1890 09 20	Hubert O'Grady		IRE comedian author
1890 09 27	Miss Eloise Juno		SCO actress
1890 10 04	Miss Olga Nethersole		UK actress
1890 10 11	Miss Maggie Moore	Mrs J. C. Williamson	US actress
1890 10 18	Laurence Cautley		UK actor
1890 10 25	John Rodger Greville		AUS comedian manager
1890 11 01	Madame Patey		UK singer
1890 11 08	Mrs Walter Hill		AUS actress
1890 11 15	Miss Fanny Enson		UK actress
1890 11 22	Miss E. Romer		UK actress
1890 11 29	William Elton		UK comedian
1890 12 06	George Leitch	George Ralf Walker	UK comedian playwright

== Digitization ==
Photographic copies of The Lorgnette from 1 July 1878 to 1 December 1898 have been digitized by the National library of Australia and may be accessed via Trove. In the "4th Series" a representative issue from the first of each month has been digitized.
