= Arthur Chapman (agent) =

Businessman in Adelaide, South Australia

Arthur Chapman (1838 – 8 May 1909) was a businessman in Adelaide, South Australia, closely associated with the Theatre Royal, Adelaide.

== History ==
James Chapman, a tailor and draper of Kent, England, emigrated to South Australia with his wife Mary and their seven children aboard Rajah, arriving at Adelaide in April 1850. He founded a drapery on Hindley Street, at that time the premier business strip in the young city.

Arthur Chapman was educated at J. L. Young's Adelaide Educational Institution and began working for his father, then after some experience at the gold diggings at Goulburn, Victoria, where he worked as assistant in a general store for three years, returned to Adelaide and took up some clerical work. He then went into business on his own account at the Register Chambers as liquidator, in 1869 taking on Michael Kingsborough as partner, in Kingsborough & Chapman, land agents and investment brokers, with an office in the Advertiser Building. Among their staff was Harry Dickson Gell, later chairman of trustees of the State Bank. They dissolved the partnership seven years later, and in 1886 Chapman went into business as hotel broker and licensed valuator, with an office in Pirie Street. On the death that year of his brother Edgar Chapman, of the brewing firm of Simms & Chapman, he took over management of his estate, which included the Theatre Royal in Hindley Street, though he was acting for the ailing brother as early as 1883, In January 1885 he had joined George Rignold and James Allison as lessee and in December they withdrew from the partnership, leaving Chapman as sole manager until Wybert Reeve became lessee in 1887.

Chapman initiated extensive alterations in 1905 at a cost of over £4,000 and a rebuild of the theatre in 1913–1914 at a cost of £21,000. He was a prominent Freemason.

== Family ==
James Chapman (1804 – 15 June 1879) married Mary Stanford (1804 – September 1895). Their children included:

- Stanford Chapman (1829 – 8 October 1905) married Martha Moon ( – 6 August 1912) in London on 9 December 1854. He was admitted to the firm of Virgoe, Son in 1865, became Virgoe, Son & Chapman, of Melbourne and Sydney, lived in Hawthorn then Kew, Victoria

- Alice Mary Chapman (2 December 1855 – 19 August 1911) married John Donaldson of Victoria
- Horace Marchent Chapman (17 November 1860 – )
- Edith Annie Chapman (19 December 1863 – ) married William St. Clair ( – ) on 11 December 1889
- Herbert Henry Chapman (17 January 1868 – 31 January 1912) born in Victoria

- Edgar Chapman (1831 – 11 September 1886) married Frances Rachael Kelsh ( – 1890) in 1853. He was with Simms & Chapman, brewers

- Charles Edgar Chapman (1854 – 4 September 1920) married to Margaret Teresa Chapman (c. 1861 – 3 January 1916)
- Clara Mary Chapman (1856 – 25 September 1925) married Clement Ferdinand Vaux Rainsford (c. 1859 – 12 September 1935) in 1882
- Harry Albert Chapman (1858 – ) sheep farmer with brother C. E. Chapman; insolvent 1883
- Emma Victoria Chapman (1860 – )
- Edgar Stanford Chapman (1862–1872) drowned in vat of hot hops liquor
- Fanny Emily Chapman (1863–1886) married Edward Headly/Heasley Hallack in 1885, his second wife
- Lily Kate Chapman (1865 – ) married James Cunningham on 16 April 1890

- Albert Chapman (1834 – 21 June 1902) of Paddington, Sydney
- Emma Chapman (1836 – 15 November 1896)
- Arthur Chapman (1838 – 8 May 1909) married Sarah Bullock ( – 27 September 1904) in 1863. She was the eldest daughter of John Bullock

- Frederick Arthur Chapman (10 March 1864 – 18 September 1925) of Lion Brewing and Malting Company

- Stanley Irwin Chapman (1892 –29 September 1940) also of Lion Brewing and Malting Co.

- Laura Simmons Chapman (13 May 1865 – 31 December 1946) married Arthur White ( – 20 June 1943) on 11 December 1901
- Percy James Chapman (30 December 1866 – 4 January 1946) married Mabel Adelaide Barnfield in 1896
- Arthur Ernest Chapman (1868 – 20 January 1890)
- Nina Blanche Chapman (1874 – 30 July 1952) married Frederick Charles Sach on 8 November 1911
- Frank Burley "Jack" Chapman (1877 – 4 March 1917) married Agnes, killed in France, WWI

- Mary Chapman (1840–1910)
- Louisa Chapman (1844 – 25 September 1883) lived with her mother, King William Street south
