= Edgar Chapman =

Australian brewer, theatre owner & businessman (1831-1886)

- Born: 1831; Adelaide, South Australia
- Died: 11 September 1886 (aged 54–55)
- Spouse: Frances Rachael Kelsh (m. 1853)
- Children: 7
- Parents: James Chapman (father); Mary Stanford (mother)

Edgar Chapman (1831 – 11 September 1886) was a brewer and businessman in Adelaide, South Australia, closely associated with the Theatre Royal.

== History ==
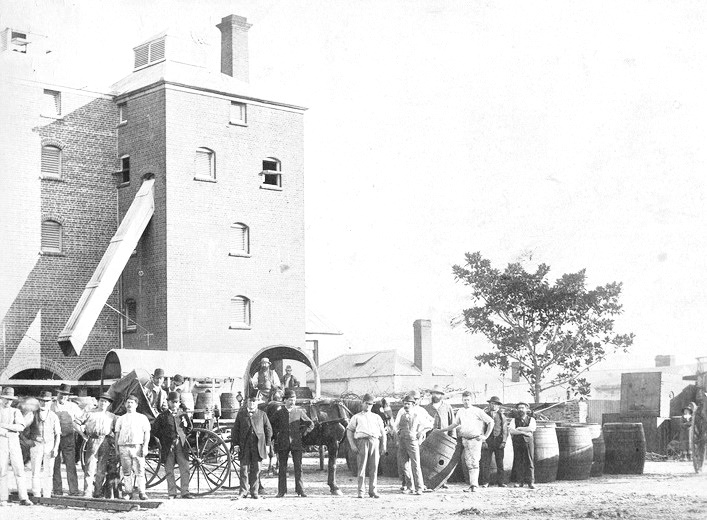
West End Brewery, West Terrace, Adelaide c. 1880

James Chapman, a tailor and draper of Kent, England, emigrated to South Australia with his wife Mary and their seven children aboard Rajah, arriving at Adelaide in April 1850. He founded a drapery on Hindley Street, at that time the premier business strip in the young city.

His eldest son Edgar Chapman joined with W. K. Simms in 1865 as Simms & Chapman to operate West End Brewery, which Simms had purchased in 1861. The partnership was dissolved in 1879.

Chapman and Caleb Peacock were passengers on the steamer Auckland when she struck a reef between Cape Conran and Cape Everard, on 27 May 1871. The ship was lost but all aboard were rescued by the Macedon.

Chapman invested in commercial property on fashionable Hindley Street. In October 1876 he purchased the Theatre Royal, its hotel and the adjoining shops for £11,000, and lost no time in appointing George R. Johnson architect for a complete rebuild of the theatre. The rebuilt house, costing about £20,000, was opened on 25 March 1878.

In 1878, on the eve of the departure of Mr. and Mrs Chapman and their daughters Clara, Emily Fannie and Lily for a European holiday, he was presented by a throng of prominent citizens with a pair of diamond studs valued at £250 (perhaps $50,000 today), the work of J. M. Wendt. While on holiday he booked various acts for Australia, but with James Alison also leased Drury Lane for an Australian production of Henry V starring George Rignold, perhaps doing something to refute criticisms by the Christian Colonist.

He was for many years owner of Kallioota Station, of 102 square miles (260 km^{2}), some 50 miles (80 km) north of Port Augusta, carrying 10,000 sheep and 800 cattle.

Beside the Theatre Royal and Theatre Royal Hotel, other properties owned by Chapman in Hindley street were the Eagle Tavern and shops owned by Burns the tailor, McKenzie, Bristow, and Lipman.

His sons Charles E. Chapman and Harry A. Chapman ran Mundowdna Station. They voluntarily declared insolvency in order to be relieved of the debt they owed to their father.

He died after three or four years of declining health, and his remains were interred at the West Terrace Cemetery. His estate was proved at £59,000 (perhaps $10 million today).

His brother Arthur took over management of his estate, which included the Theatre Royal in Hindley Street, though he was acting for Edgar as early as 1883, In January 1885 he had joined Rignold and Allison as lessee and in December they withdrew from the partnership, leaving Chapman as sole manager until Wybert Reeve became lessee in 1887. Arthur Chapman initiated extensive alterations in 1905 at a cost of over £4,000 and a rebuild of the theatre in 1913–1914 at a cost of £21,000.

== Other interests ==
He was appointed Justice of the Peace 1877.

He was interested in horse racing; served as a steward at the "Old Course" (Victoria Park).

Chapman's affair with the theatre was not only financial. He had a passable singing voice, and "trod the boards" on occasion: In 1880 he played "King Artexomines" in Rhodes's Bombastes Furioso.

In 1882 he had several landscapes painted to order by H. J. Johnstone.

== Family ==
James Chapman (1804 – 15 June 1879) married Mary Stanford (1804 – September 1895). Their children included:

- Stanford Chapman (1829 – 8 October 1905) married Martha Moon ( – 6 August 1912) in London on 9 December 1854. He was admitted to the firm of Virgoe, Son in 1865, became Virgoe, Son & Chapman, of Melbourne and Sydney, lived in Hawthorn then Kew, Victoria

- Alice Mary Chapman (2 December 1855 – 19 August 1911) married John Donaldson of Victoria
- Horace Marchent Chapman (17 November 1860 – )
- Edith Annie Chapman (19 December 1863 – ) married William St. Clair ( – ) on 11 December 1889
- Herbert Henry Chapman (17 January 1868 – 31 January 1912) born in Victoria

- Edgar Chapman (1831 – 11 September 1886) married Frances Rachael Kelsh ( – 1890) in 1853

- Charles Edgar Chapman (1854 – 4 September 1920) married to Margaret Teresa Chapman (c. 1861 – 3 January 1916)
- Clara Mary Chapman (1856 – 25 September 1925) married Clement Ferdinand Vaux Rainsford (c. 1859 – 12 September 1935) in 1882
- Harry Albert Chapman (1858 – ) sheep farmer with brother C. E. Chapman; insolvent 1883
- Emma Victoria Chapman (1860 – )
- Edgar Stanford Chapman (21 March 1862 – 11 November 1872) The lad fell into a vat of hot hops liquor at the West Terrace brewery, and drowned
- Fanny Emily Chapman (30 September 1863 – 1886) married Edward Headly/Heasley Hallack in 1885, his second wife
- Lily Kate Chapman (23 June 1865 – ) married James Cunningham on 16 April 1890

- Albert Chapman (1834 – 21 June 1902) of Paddington, Sydney
- Emma Chapman (1836 – 15 November 1896)
- Arthur Chapman (1838 – 8 May 1909) married Sarah Bullock ( – 27 September 1904) in 1863. She was the eldest daughter of John Bullock

- Frederick Arthur Chapman (10 March 1864 – 18 September 1925) of Lion Brewing and Malting Company

- Stanley Irwin Chapman (1892 –29 September 1940) also of Lion Brewing and Malting Co.

- Laura Simmons Chapman (13 May 1865 – 31 December 1946) married Arthur White ( – 20 June 1943) on 11 December 1901
- Percy James Chapman (30 December 1866 – 4 January 1946) married Mabel Adelaide Barnfield in 1896
- Arthur Ernest Chapman (1868 – 20 January 1890)
- Nina Blanche Chapman (1874 – 30 July 1952) married Frederick Charles Sach on 8 November 1911
- Frank Burley "Jack" Chapman (1877 – 4 March 1917) married Agnes, killed in France, WWI

- Mary Chapman (1840–1910)
- Louisa Chapman (1844 – 25 September 1883) lived with her mother, King William Street south
