= Academy of Music, Adelaide =

Former theatre in Adelaide, South Australia

The Academy of Music was a live performance venue in Adelaide, South Australia, remembered as the scene of three major fires within a decade.

== History ==
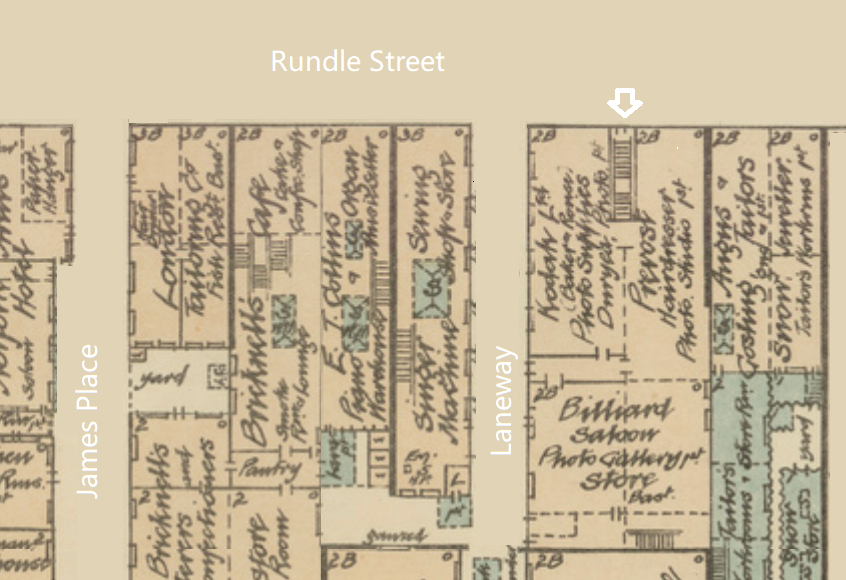
Academy of Music, Rundle Street

In 1878 Saul Solomon and Robert C. Castle negotiated with T. G. Waterhouse for a 50-year lease on his 48 by 105.5 feet (14.6 m × 32.2 m) site at 37−39 Rundle Street, Adelaide, opposite the Globe Hotel. They engaged architect Ernest H. Bayer, and builder A. G. Chapman, who demolished the four existing shops, and excavated the whole area to a depth of 9.5 feet (2.9 m) for a cellar, floored with slate, subsequently rented to Primrose & Co., brewers. The ground floor consisted two shops, each 15 feet (4.6 m) wide, and between them an entrance-hall with stairs leading to the theatre. From a midpoint landing the stairs diverted to the left and right, leading to the rear of the hall and to the gallery. Behind the shops was a billiard-hall and stairs leading to the stage. The floor of the hall was level, rather than raked, and the height floor-to-ceiling was 80 feet (24 m). The gallery seated 150 and had access to an outside balcony. Total seating capacity was around 800. The first lessee and manager was John E. Fulton, and the theatre opened on 2 June 1879 with a performance of "Conrad and Lizette" by the Baker and Farron Troupe (Pete J. Baker, real name Peter Frank Walter, and T. J. Farron).

The seating was built up in tiers towards the back in order to remedy the problem of the flat floor, and the work was completed in time for Edward Maclean's Juvenile Troubadors to play Struck Oil for L. M. Bayless on 29 May 1880. They had previously mounted the play in Queensland, New South Wales, and Victoria, but J. C. Williamson's threatened Bayless with legal action if they played it in Adelaide. Bayless retaliated with his own threat, of libel, Williamson having publicly accused him of theft, but afterwards backed down and the "Juvenile Troubadours" put on a substitute programme.

=== The first fire ===
Shortly after midnight on the morning of Sunday, 6 January 1884, fire spread through the building, which was totally gutted before the brigade got it under control. John Williams, who worked nightshift at the Primrose's Union Brewery on Grenfell Street, behind the academy, awakened George Moore, the caretaker, who was sleeping in one of the rooms above the stage. They left by the fire escape on the west side and survived without serious injury, but Moore lost all his clothes and possessions, including £58 savings, perhaps $10,000 in today's values. The wardrobe and properties, dresses and jewellery of "Hudson's Surprise Party" were lost, as were the uniforms and instruments of the orchestra. Thomas Hudson's company transferred to Garner's Rooms for the rest of their engagement, including a vice-regal performance on the Wednesday, in such good spirits none could guess at their loss.

=== The New Academy ===
Solomon and Castle had the academy insured, but not sufficient to fully restore the building, so they rebuilt it as a bijou theatre. The shops and billiard saloon on the ground floor took little time to restore, and the architects Henderson & Marryat (Note: C. Howard Marryat and Henry J. Henderson) retained the outer walls as a frame for the new design. The cloakroom and lobbies were done away with, the stage enlarged to match that of the Theatre Royal, with a proscenium 14 inches (360 mm) thick and fitted with fireproof doors. Access to the stage, pit and gallery was by external stairs; the stage from the right-of-way on the east side and the others by an iron stairway to the west. The floor of the seating area was raked for better visibility from all areas. Every fire precaution possible was taken, including the fitting of hydrants in four places. The builder was N. W. Trudgen of Gay's Arcade fame.

The New Academy opened 9 August 1884; the first lessee was F. H. Pollock. Pollock's first attraction was Pollard's Lilliputian Opera Company, with a four-week season, opening on 9 August 1884 to a capacity audience — a little over a thousand — for Planquette's Les cloches de Corneville .

=== The second fire ===
On the morning of 3 January 1885 the Academy of Music was again destroyed by fire. The alarm was raised by a policeman on the beat in Rundle Street, and Williams, the watchman at the Union Brewery, immediately started hosing the rear of the building. The fire was not as intense as that of the previous year, but when the reels arrived at 5 o'clock the whole of the interior of the academy ablaze and destruction was no less complete, and they could do nothing except protect adjacent premises. Much of the iron ceiling and roof and all the iron structure survived. Clinton's Melbourne Dramatic Company, who had been presenting the F. H. Linklater's pantomime The Babes in the Wood, lost all their scenery and costumes in the fire. This time there was no nightwatchman, as Pollock had decided to dispense with his services. Again, as in the case of most of Adelaide's fires, there was no clue as to where or how it started. The only damage to the ground floor shops was from water. Two of Albers' billiard tables were irretrievably ruined. Pollock was one of the greatest losers, being completely uninsured.

=== Rebuilding ===
On 6 June 1885 the academy was reopened, Henderson and Marryat having re-submitted to the owners the plan which had been knocked back the previous year as too expensive. The roof was raised somewhat, and beneath the gallery was installed a dress circle, which connected to an outer verandah as an enclosed smoking room. Also at the centre of the dress circle was a vice-regal box with seating for six or seven guests. Each time the academy is destroyed, said one newspaper, it arises much improved, and now deserves the pretentious title of "bijou theatre", perhaps angling for a name change as Melbourne's Academy of Music had become the Bijou Theatre in 1880. It opened on 7 June 1885 with Harry Rickards' variety show, of which he was the decided "star" alongside Harry Phillips and Harry Cremar, an inferior "minstrel" to Tommy Hudson.

=== The third fire ===
The academy was again hit by fire on the evening of Friday 24 December 1886. On this occasion the fire did not originate in the theatre, but in Castle's drapery shop, on the west side of the brewery lane, and may have started with the ignition of displayed garments, which were often hung close to the gas mantle illumination. The blaze in that building was so fierce that it spread to Cunningham's homewares store, and to the academy, despite the wind coming from that direction. Primrose's workmen once again did their best to stop the fire spreading. Fire appliances from the main Fire Station and Brigade No. 2 from Waymouth Street were delayed and further hampered by the crowds of shoppers and holiday-makers who had assembled to enjoy the spectacle. Deputy-superintendent Ronald Shearing entered Cunningham's, followed by firemen John Gardner and Albert Clark, (Note: Often mis-reported as "Alfred Clarke", Albert George Clark, fourth son of Robert Clark, died 25 December 1886, aged 23 years. He was a member of the North Adelaide Volunteer Fire Brigade. His companion was John Anthoney Hughes Gardner, aged 30, one of the permanent firemen at the head station.) then just as the Town Hall clock struck eight, the roof fell in, causing the walls to collapse inwards. Shearing was unharmed, Clark died in hospital, and Gardner was buried beneath the rubble and his body not recovered until the following day. The walls of the academy survived, as did much of the floor.

=== Later use ===
Solomon and Castle relinquished their lease on the property, and A. Waterhouse, who was now the responsible landlord, converted the building to one of two storeys, the upper floor of which was taken by Mary Eliza Aish, (Note: Eliza Mary Aish, née Waterman, married Alfred Aish on 9 May 1877. Alfred was son of hotelier Alfred George Aish. She died in Adelaide 23 April 1912.) who moved her Café de Paris (Note: It continued to be called Mrs Aish's Café de Paris long after 1895, when its founder moved to Perth and established the South Australian Café.) business there from King William Street. She had it fitted out in the best of taste, with a separate ladies' tea and coffee room, a smoking room, and a large balcony in addition to the spacious dining room, which seated over 100. In 1902 the premises were part taken over by the Duryea company as a photographic studio and part by L Prevost, as a hairdressing establishment. The Duryea photographic studio, operated by one or more sons of Townsend Duryea, became by amalgamation the Thelma-Duryea studio in 1911.
