= Frederick Pollock =

Frederick Pollock may refer to:

- Sir Frederick Pollock, 1st Baronet (1783–1870), British lawyer and Tory politician
- Sir Frederick Pollock, 3rd Baronet (1845–1937), British jurist and grandson of the 1st baronet
- Friedrich Pollock (1894–1970), also Frederick, German philosopher
- Frederick Hart Pollock (1842–1908), Australian actor
- Frederick Richard Pollock (1827–1899), British army officer and administrator in British India
