= Rignold =

Rignold is a surname. Notable people with the surname include:

- George Rignold (1839–1912), English actor
- Hugo Rignold (1905–1976), English conductor and violinist
- William Rignold (1836–1904), English actor, brother of George
