= F. H. Linklater =

English barrister (c. 1849–1937)

Frederick Harvie Linklater (c. 1849 – 1 October 1937) was an English barrister who had a prominent career in Australia. He was the author of several important legal works and popular stage plays. He was personally involved in a bigamous marriage and two libel cases, then was accused of master-minding an insurance fraud. He changed legal jurisdictions several times in what appears to be attempts to start afresh.

== Early life ==
Linklater was born in 1847 or c. 1849, the son of a London solicitor who specialized in bankruptcy. He was educated at Eton, and entered Trinity College, Cambridge in 1866, where in addition to the ordinary subjects he studied Divinity under John Jackson, later Bishop of Lincoln and Bishop of London, graduating B.A. in 1869. He also learned to speak Hindustani from two Indian fellow-students. While at Cambridge he was involved with the Amateur Dramatic Club, and participated in rowing, fencing and billiards. On leaving university he worked in his father's office, then thanks to his knowledge of Hindustani was recruited by Sir George Jessel, the Master of the Rolls, to go to India to take evidence in a case.

== Career ==
On returning to London he decided on a career in the law and entered at Lincoln's Inn, suspending his studies during the Franco-Prussian War to act as reporter for the Daily News. He continued his legal studies and was called to the Bar in 1873. While a student and while practising in the Court of Chancery, he also worked as drama and opera critic for the Pall Mall Gazette, and also contributed to Routledge's Magazine and other periodicals.

=== New South Wales ===
In 1876, Linklater left for New South Wales, where he joined the Bar, and had a considerable practice. He wrote a treatise on the Law of Divorce, and served as Government reporter in the Supreme Court. He also found time to write articles for the newspapers an act as drama critic. In 1879, he was charged with bigamy, having on 8 November 1877 married Elizabeth Honey, second daughter of John and Mary J. Honey while still having a wife Constance Linklater, whom he married at Streatham in October 1871, still living in England. He was confined in Darlinghurst Gaol pending arrival of evidence from England. When that failed to materialise he was released on his own recognizance. While in jail he wrote, as "The Man in the Iron Mask", an item for the Evening News criticising the medical system there, which was taken as a personal attack by the visiting surgeon, Dr O'Connor, who sued the newspaper and was awarded £500. The Sydney newspapers reported that Elizabeth Linklater née Honey divorced him in Autumn, 1880.

=== South Australia ===
In 1880, he left for South Australia, where apart from his legal practice he wrote for the Adelaide Bulletin and Lantern and was responsible for several works for the theatre. He also acted as South Australian correspondent for The Era, a "leading London theatrical journal", and as "Pelts" acted as Adelaide correspondent for The Bunyip of Gawler. In 1883 he was sued for libel for an article in that paper describing how Moss Samuel Solomon had been caught spying on the ladies' dressing-room at the Theatre Royal by the actresses concerned. Linklater was found guilty and made to publish an apology and fined £100, perhaps $10,000 in today's values.

He acted as lawyer for Barker, Hicks, and Forsyth in the 1880 insurance fraud trials, but was later accused by Forsyth, of being ringleader of the conspiracy.

=== Victoria ===
In 1886, he left for Victoria, where his name was little known (and was henceforth known as F. Harvie-Linklater). In 1890, he was living at Henry Street, Upper Hawthorn, where Mary J. Honey, his mother-in-law, died. He was a valued member of the Mornington Church of England and in 1897 served briefly on the Frankston and Hastings Shire Council. He took up residence in "Boscombe", Black Rock, Victoria, in 1898, and joined the yacht club. By 1910, he had an office at 47 Queen Street, Melbourne, where he was acting as solicitor to several gold mining companies.

== Death ==
Linklater died on 1 October 1937. There was no obituary and his death notice may have been placed by the Royal Brighton Yacht Club, of which he was an old and valued member. His widow Elizabeth Linklater had a residence "Colwyn", at Dandenong Road, Windsor when she died on 16 December 1941, aged 84 years.

== Bibliography ==
- F. H. Linklater (1879). The Statutes Relating to Equity and Lunacy and in Force in New South Wales.
- G. Knox; F. H. Linklater; G. H. Fitzhardinge. Reports of cases argued and determined in the Supreme Court of New South Wales : with tables of the cases and principal matters. Vol. 2.
- HMS Pinbehind (1881), a burlesque on HMS Pinafore, which was produced at the Academy of Music.
- An adaptation of William Brough's Field of the Cloth of Gold at the Theatre Royal, Adelaide
- The Debutante, C. H. Compton (Note: Charles Henry Compton (1831–1883) was an organist and music teacher in Melbourne, for some years organist at Christ Church, North Adelaide, also as accompanist to travelling theatre companies. A sister married Justice Holroyd.) and F. H. Linklater (1882)
- The Babes in the Wood, or, "the Heartless Uncle and the Good Queen Fairy" (1884) A pantomime which he produced in a week, and was running when the theatre, the Academy of Music was destroyed by fire.
