= White's Rooms =

Building in Adelaide, Australia

White's Rooms, later known as Adelaide Assembly Room, was a privately owned function centre which opened in 1856 on King William Street, Adelaide, South Australia. It became Garner's Theatre in 1880, then passed through several hands, being known as the Tivoli theatre, Bijou Theatre, Star Picture Theatre and finally in 1916 the Majestic Theatre and Majestic Hotel.

== History ==
George White (1813 – 12 November 1876) was a Gloucestershire tailor who emigrated with his family to South Australia on the Royal Admiral, (Note: An assertion by a credible witness puts him aboard Tam o'Shanter, which arrived in November 1836.) arriving in Adelaide in January 1838. He set up a tailoring business in Hindley Street, then took up a position with William Pearce in Rundle Street. Pearce quit the business in May 1843, and White purchased much of his stock, and around 1852 moved to larger premises in King William Street (which later became the public bar of the Clarence Hotel). His Assembly Rooms were opened on 26 June 1856 with a Grand Masonic Ball, and were for many years the only place of public entertainment in the city. Musicians who hired the hall for public concerts included:

- Lynch Family bellringers 1871

James Allison, better known for his association with Samuel Lazar and the Theatre Royal, was in 1877 lessee of the rooms.

In 1878 Thomas Waterhouse purchased the property from George White's estate, and it remained in that family for many decades.

=== The rooms ===
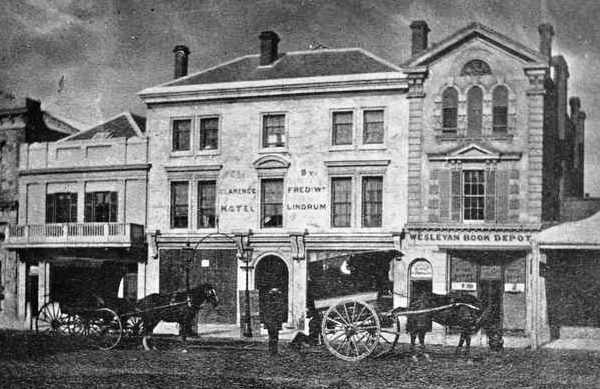
White's Rooms, Clarence Hotel and Wesleyan Book Depot c. 1870

The building at 80–88 King William Street was designed by George Kingston. Its Assembly Room was 41 by 86 feet (12 m × 26 m) with a 30-foot-high (9.1 m) ceiling, and the complex included offices, retail business spaces and an Arbitration Room, where daytime auction sales, meetings, and other gatherings were held, and was co-located with the Clarence Hotel.

The place was remodelled several times to keep abreast of the competition, (one major upgrade was superintended by E. J. Woods)

=== The restaurant ===
Below the main hall, founded in 1856 and attached to the Clarence Hotel, was Bayston & Aldridge's restaurant, from November 1858 solely managed by George Aldridge. It was here that John McDouall Stuart was given a grand reception, presided by Sir Dominick Daly, on the evening of 21 January 1863, on his return from crossing the continent from south to north. Then in 1868 Aldridge left to take over the restaurant associated with the new theatre in Hindley Street, and F. W. Lindrum, father of Frederick and Walter Lindrum, took it over, naming it "Shades" or "Adelaide Shades". One of the large underground halls was set up by him as a billiard saloon, the finest in the city.

=== Subsequent history ===
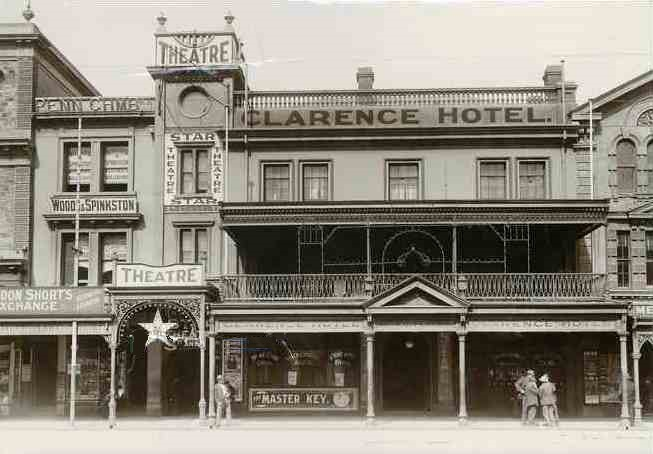
Star Theatre and Clarence Hotel c. 1914

In 1880 White's Rooms was remodelled by George Gordon to become Garner's Theatre, for entrepreneur Arthur Garner with Wybert Reeve the theatre manager. It was not entirely successful, and the name reverted somewhat to Garner's Rooms. It has been asserted that the change of name was to avoid losing patronage of the Wesleyans, to whom the word "theatre" connoted sin and blasphemy, no matter what the performance may be. In 1884 T. P. Hudson took over the lease, and after more redecoration reopened the theatre as The Bijou. Among its users between 1890 and 1899 were the Garrick Club theatre group and the South Australian Literary Societies' Union.

Harry Rickards became the next proprietor in 1900, demolishing much of the old structure and renaming it The Tivoli. It closed in August 1913 to reopen as the New Tivoli Theatre in Grote Street. Bud Atkinson promptly took over the lease and in September 1913 it became the Star Theatre, a cinema screening a one-hour programme continuously from 11 am to 10.30 pm daily. It closed in November 1915, but was the start of a chain of movie theatres.

In 1916 the building, and the Clarence Hotel, were demolished to become the Majestic Theatre and hotel. In 1928 Sir Benjamin Fuller, John Fuller and Bert Lennon purchased the theatre from the owners A. E. and F. Tolley.

== Some notable uses and users ==
- The annual full-dress Masonic Ball was the first event held in the Rooms, and was held there every succeeding year until 1863.
- The Bachelors' Balls were held there
- Adelaide Educational Institution held their prizegivings there each June and December.
- The Horticultural and Floricultural Society held exhibitions there.
- It served as a meeting hall for the Rev. Silas Mead for twelve months while the Flinders Street Baptist Church was being built.
- A public breakfast was tendered to McDouall Stuart in White's Rooms on the return of his party's fourth expedition into the interior.
- The annual meeting of the Bible Society was held there.
- The South Australian Institute, whose library was then in Neales Buildings, King William-street, held its quarterly soiree in White's Rooms; entertainment being provided by artistes such as Miss Tozer (afterwards Mrs Peryman), Miss Chalker, Miss Rowe, and Miss Bryan.
- Visiting artistes Henry Farquharson, Anna Bishop, Charles Lascelles, the Carandini Company (Marie Carandini and her two daughters Rosina and Fanny, and Walter Sherwin), and the Beaumont and Wilkinson Concert Company.
- Messrs. Horace Poussard and Rene Douay, who composed and performed Dead Heroes, as a tribute to the ill-starred Burke and Wills.
- Carl Linger, who composed the music to the Song of Australia was a frequent performer, and in September 1863 a concert was held in his memory.
- A concert was given by the Adelaide Philharmonic Society for the benefit of the widow and child of R. B. White, the leader of the Society, who, with several others, was drowned while crossing the Gulf on a holiday excursion. The soloists were Mesdames Harris and Peryman, Mr. E. H. Hallack, and C. Lyons.
- Fritz Heydecke (who was lost with the Sultana) and R. W. Kohler were popular local instrumentalists, staged regular concerts.
- Tragedians Boothroyd Fairclough and Walter Montgomery gave recitals there; Mary Frances Scott-Siddons made her first appearance before an Adelaide audience there;
- The Majeroni Company appeared in various plays and comic operas
- Rev. Charles Clark gave his popular lectures in White's Rooms

Reports that Adelaide City Council meetings were held there during construction of the Town Hall, are spurious.

== Family ==
George White (1813 – 12 November 1876) married Eliza Baxter (1814 – 16 August 1888) in Gloucestershire on 24 November 1834; with children Charles and Jane emigrated to South Australia on the Royal Admiral, which arrived in South Australia in January 1838.

White was a keen gardener and viticulturist: his vineyard and formal garden later became the suburb of Rosefield.

- Charles White (1835 – 30 June 1891) was one of the leading tailors of Adelaide, for some time as partner with William Bishop jr., as White & Bishop of King William Street. He married Margaret Ann Chapman (c. 1839 – 14 July 1867); they had four daughters; her only son died of measles; she died six days later. Charles married again, to Adolphina Miller ( – ) on 15 April 1871; they had two more children.
- Jane White (1837 – 1907) married Charles Pearce ( – )
- Richard Baxter White RAM (1839 – 23 June 1872) married Rosalie Elizabeth Caroline Reich ( –1880) in 1865. He was a noted violinist and music teacher, leader of the Adelaide Philharmonic Society; lost presumed drowned in Gulf St. Vincent when yacht Sultana capsized. Rosalie was a daughter of Johann Carl Christian Reich.
- George Benjamin White (1841 – 20 December 1878) married Sarah Bignell (c. 1850 – 17 December 1879), ran hotel at Truro. After his death she managed the Queen's Head Hotel; died of peritonitis twelve months later, after taking poison as abortifacient.
- Sarah Ann White (1843 – 26 April 1899) married Charles Augustus Bleechmore ( – ) on 14 September 1865
- Emily Baxter White (1847 – 14 July 1923) married William Thomas Phillis ( – c. 20 February 1909) on 5 March 1874, ran farm at Snowtown
- Henry White (1849 – 23 June 1872) missing, presumed drowned, with brother Richard.
- Harriett Baxter White (1854 – c. 28 April 1905) married Arthur Franklin ( – ), lived at Magill Road,
- Frederick William White (3 May 1858 – 1935) married Mary Louisa Wilcox ( – ) on 28 May 1885*

== See also ==
- Albert Hall, Adelaide
- Green's Exchange
- Jackman's Rooms

== Sources ==
- Pioneers Association of South Australia: George White
