= Her Majesty's Theatre, Sydney =

Her Majesty's Theatre
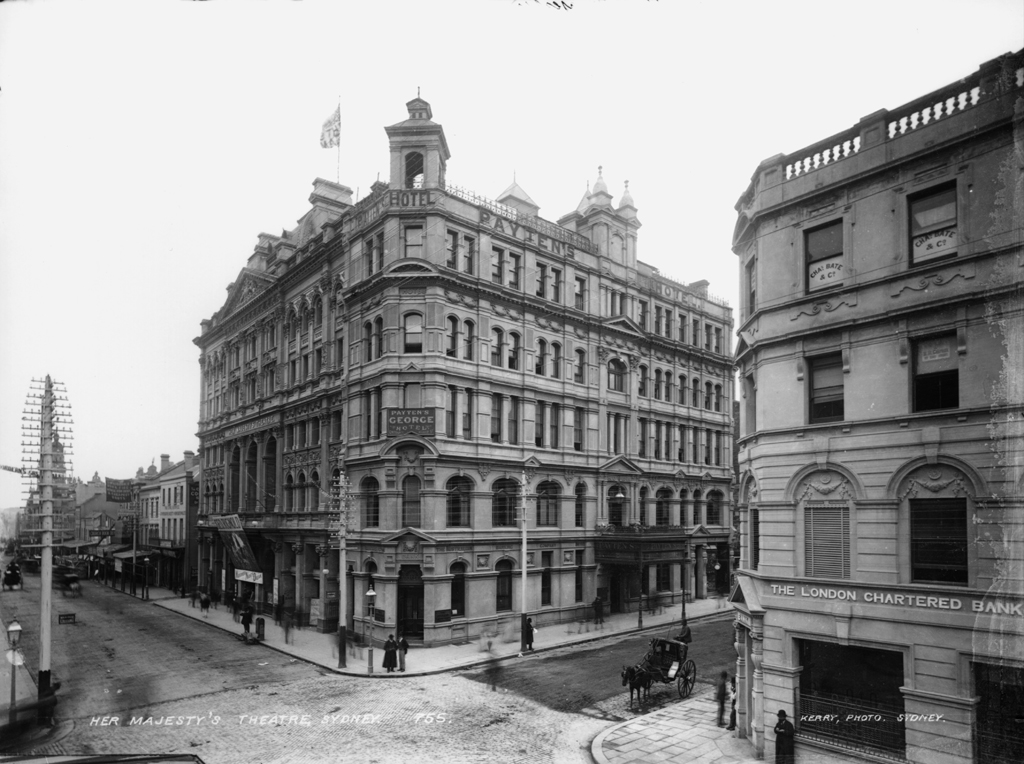
- Original Her Majesty's Theatre, c. 1887–1917.
- Interactive map of Her Majesty's Theatre
- Address: Corner of Pitt and Market Street; 107 Quay Street; Sydney; Australia
- Coordinates: 33.870658°S 151.20835°E
- Capacity: 2000
- Type: Proscenium arch

Construction
- Opened: 10 September 1887
- Closed: 10 June 1933
- Demolished: 1933, 1960s, 2000s
- Rebuilt: 1902, 1927, 1975
- Architects: Morell and Kemp

Her Majesty's Theatre, Sydney, Australia, refers to three theatres of the same name none of which remain standing. They were located in central Sydney on either Pitt Street or Quay Street.

== History ==
=== First theatre (1887–1933) ===
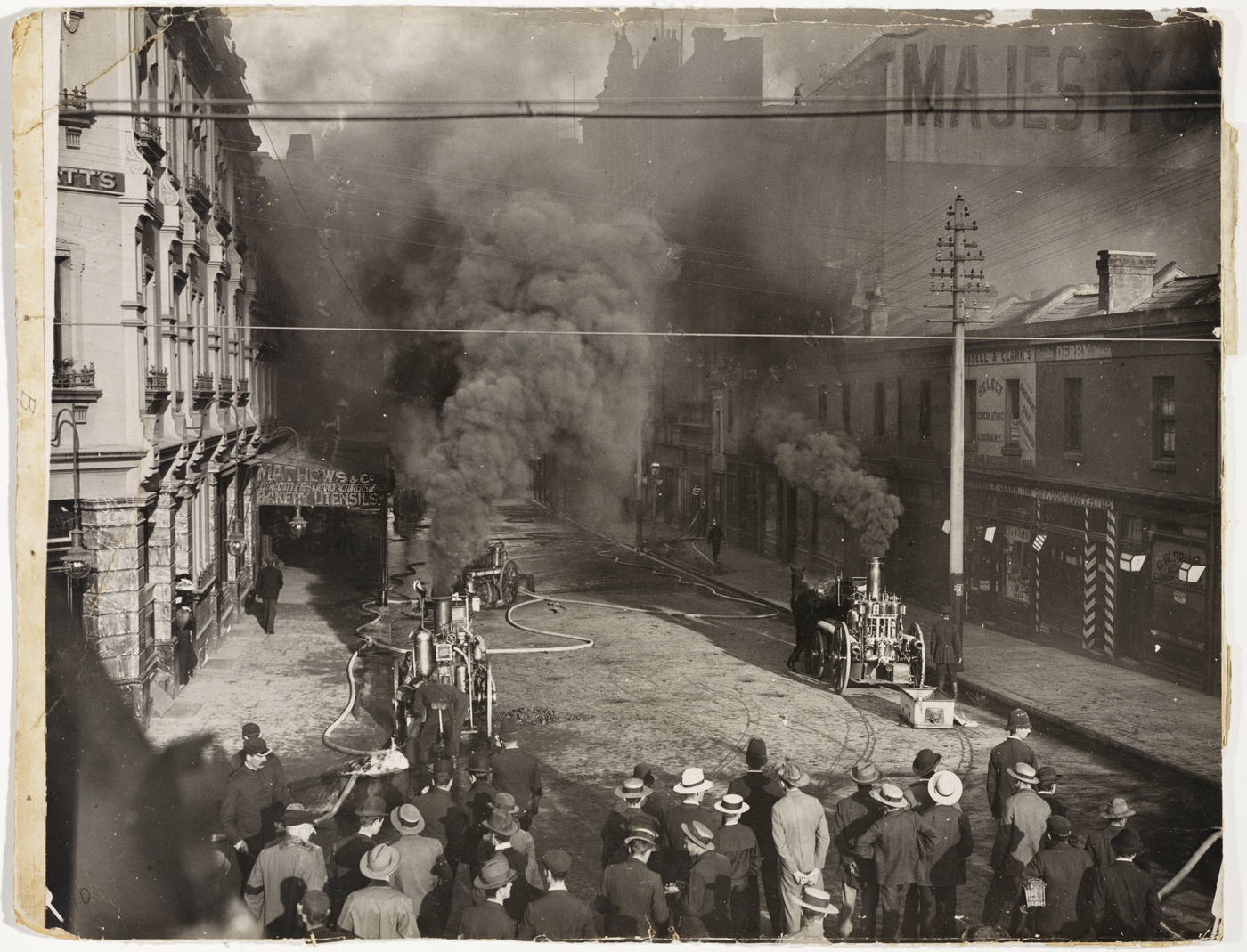
Her Majesty's Theatre Fire, Sydney, March 1902

The original Her Majesty's had its origin in the partnership of James Allison and George Rignold, lessees of Adelaide's Theatre Royal and the Melbourne Opera House. They secured a long lease on a site in Pitt Street, Sydney, and formed a company for the purpose of founding a theatre. The theatre was designed by architects Gustavus Alphonse Morell and John Edward Kemp.

The foundation stone was laid by Sydney mayor Thomas Playfair in December 1884. The opening play was Henry V, and lessee Rignold was the lead player. The Governor of New South Wales, Lord Carrington, attended the opening night, arriving with his wife in a carriage, with a military escort. Rignold held the lease for eight years, his final production was Cloncarty on 21 September 1895. For a short period, Alfred Woods leased the theatre, then J. C. Williamson and George Musgrove took over in 1896.

In early 1902, Sydney was undergoing sporadic outbreaks of the bubonic plague, which threatened the theatre and surrounding businesses with closure. On Sunday 23 March 1902, after a performance of Ben Hur and after the theatre had been disinfected, a fire broke out at around 6am. The asbestos safety curtain failed to operate and the interior of Her Majesty's, including the expensive props and costumes, was destroyed. The only victim of the fire was a woman inside a neighbouring bakery who died when the theatre's wall collapsed onto her.

The theatre re-opened on 1 August 1903, replaced by a new four-storey building on the Market Street site and a new Edwardian style interior on the Pitt Street side behind the original facade designed by architect William Pitt. Financial pressures from a new amusement tax, competition from the new talking movies and the economic climate led to the closure of the theatre on 10 June 1933. The last performance was The Maid of the Mountains, starring Gladys Moncrieff. Bulldozers moved in the next day and demolished the theatre. A Woolworths retail store opened on the site 22 March 1934 and where Westfield Sydney stands today.

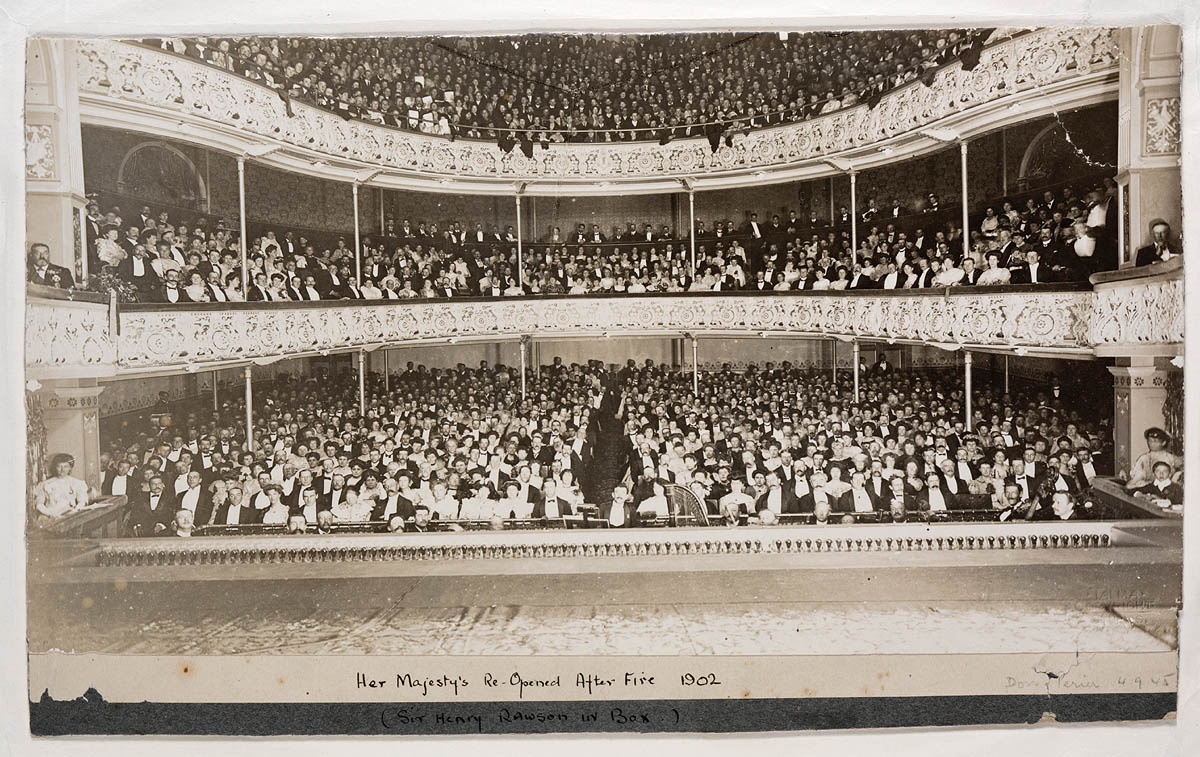
Her Majesty's Theatre re-opened after the fire, Sydney, 1903; with Governor Sir Henry Rawson in the top left box - A. J. Perier

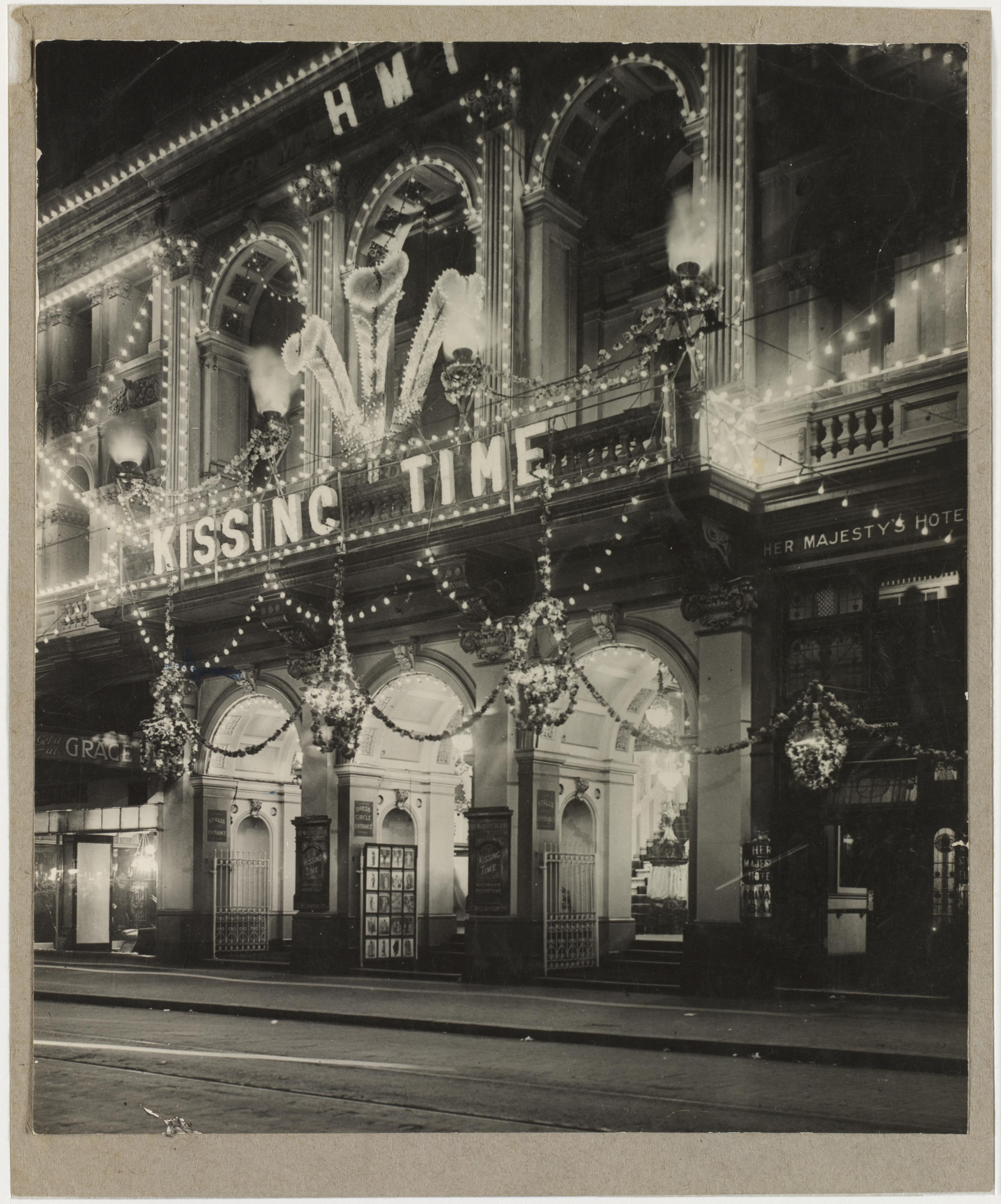
Her Majesty's Theatre, Sydney, decorated and illuminated for the visit of the Prince of Wales and showing "Kissing time", 1920 - photographer unknown (7265741576)

=== Second theatre (1927–1970) ===
The second theatre, originally named the Empire Theatre, was located in Quay Street, at the Bijou Lane corner. It opened with the show Sunny on 26 February 1927. When J. C. Williamson's wanted a long run for My Fair Lady, they renamed it to Her Majesty's Theatre on 21 May 1960. The theatre barely survived the 1960s and was destroyed by fire on 31 July 1970.

=== Third theatre (1973–2001) ===
The third theatre was also located on Quay Street, Haymarket, at No. 107 (near Central Station). It opened on 30 November 1973 and closed in 2001 but is no longer standing. Apartments have been built on the site.

== Depictions ==
The $100 Australian banknote (in the background of the Dame Nellie Melba portrait) features an image of the interior of the first theatre.

== See also ==
- List of destroyed heritage
