= Garrick Club (Adelaide) =

South Australian amateur theatrical groups

The Garrick Club (Note: The name paid homage to the great actor David Garrick, and had no connection to the Garrick Club of London, a "gentlemen's club" for thespians and patrons of the theatre.) was the name which could apply to several South Australian amateur theatrical groups, perhaps tenuously related, the most successful being the incarnation which operated from 1892 to 1899.

== History ==
On 13 March 1850 a company of theatre enthusiasts (Nicholson, Dibold, Goodrich and Bonney) calling themselves the "Dramatic Amateurs" or "Amateur Dramatic Society", put on several plays at the New Queen's Theatre, then changed their name to Adelaide Garrick Club. The New Queen's Theatre closed its doors shortly afterwards and following productions were put on in the Victoria Theatre. Was this the same as the Royal Victoria Theatre (the remodelled Queen's Theatre)? W. M. Akhurst was secretary in 1850.

The Garrick Cricket Club was formed in 1875, which staged several successful annual entertainments at White's Rooms, that of 1876 including Breaking the Spell (an operetta by Offenbach) with W. R. Pybus on piano.

In 1889 the Garrick Club was re-formed or its name revived, with Misses Beddome, Schrader, Dora Moulden, and Nelson, and Messrs. Angel, Guy Boothby, Cook, G. V. S. Dunn, C. M. Gribble, R. Herbert, H. R. Holder, M. Marcus, A. L. Parker, and Lewes Wicksteed as prominent members. Their productions included an operetta written in South Australia.

In 1892 the Garrick Dramatic Club was founded by Edward Reeves and John Henry Lyons. Membership was invited from the city's elocutionists: E. Reeves, C. Morgan, Benjamin H. Gillman, E. H. Shaw, H. T. Sparrow, R. A. C. Herbert, A. Norton, C. C. Paltridge, J. H. Lyons, Miss Wadham, Aileen Bancroft and Miss Pizey and soon reached a high standard of performance, with critics enthusiastic rather than generous. Later members included Walter Bentley, E. H. Shaw, Mary Bancroft, Beatrice Gordon, Marion Woodcock, Charles Morgan, Richard Herbert, J. D. Furlonge, Frank Seaton, Fairfax Kendal, Tom Potts, Kate Shirley, Marian Daniels and Alexander Cochrane. The club appears to have folded after a triumphant 1899 season which ended anticlimactically with a poorly-attended finale at the Theatre Royal.

== Selected performances ==
- 13 March 1850 Speed the Plough by Morton for the German Hospital
- 5 June 1850 A Cure for the Heart Ache by Morton (Opie/Miss Lazar/Mrs Evans) for the German Hospital
- 25 September 1850 The School of Reform by Morton as a benefit for the widow and children of Captain/Inspector Litchfield. (Moore/Opie) to mixed reviews
- 18 September 1862 The Lady of Lyons by Edward Bulwer-Lytton as a benefit for Miss Rose Edouin, and repeated on 30 September at the Port Adelaide Theatre.
- 6 December 1865 Othello by Shakespeare in aid of the Albert Bells fund
- 25 September 1889 Memories and The Nabob by Guy Boothby, an Adelaide writer and actor, at the Albert Hall
- 9 September 1890 Dimple's Lovers, an operetta by Cecil J. Sharp and Guy Boothby at the Albert Hall.
- 31 May 1892 London Assurance by Dion Boucicault at the North Adelaide Institute. Furnishing and decoration were by P. LeCornu and C. Cawthorne led the orchestra. The club took this production to Hudson's "Bijou" (White's Rooms remodelled) and several other halls and proceeds were directed to the Children's Hospital.
- 16 November 1892 Caste by Tom Robertson
- 2 February 1893 Long Odds by Conway Edwardes at the North Adelaide Institute, Clarence P. Caterer at the piano
- 22 March 1893 Ruth's Romance by Frederick W. Broughton in aid of the Brisbane floods
- 16 June 1893 Written in Sand performed at the opening of the Walkerville Town Hall
- 9 August 1893 Fennel by Jerome K. Jerome at St. Peters Town Hall in aid of the Blind Institute
- 19 February 1894 The Squatter's Pardon by J. H. Lyons at the Bijou Theatre
- 24 May 1895 Blow for Blow by H. J. Byron at the North Adelaide Institute in aid of the North Adelaide Lacrosse Club
- 25 August 1896 Our Regiment by Henry Hamilton, at the North Adelaide Institute, later to an almost deserted Theatre Royal.
