= Frederick Hart Pollock =

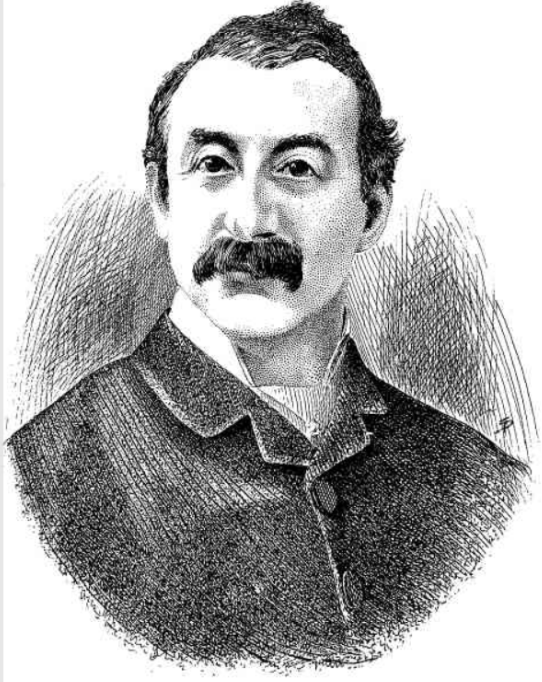
- Portrait of F. H. Pollock in 1890
- Born: June 22, 1842; Newport, Wales
- Died: November 10, 1908 (aged 66); Adelaide, Australia
- Occupations: Actor, Theater Manager
- Spouse: Mary Myers (m. 1875)

Frederick Hart Pollock (22 June 1842 – 10 November 1908) was an actor and publican, remembered as the lessee-manager of the Theatre Royal, Adelaide, South Australia.

== History ==
Pollock was born in Newport, Wales, and at age 18 voyaged to Melbourne where he had an uncle. He moved to New Zealand, where he took acting lessons from Clarance Holt, father of Bland Holt and who was in Dunedin for some years, then joined a company touring India and other Eastern countries. He was working as manager of the Corinthian Theatre, Calcutta when he first met the great actors George Titheradge and Boothroyd Fairclough. While in Singapore in 1875 he married the Perth actress Mary Myers and together toured the East. He brought a troupe of Japanese jugglers to Perth around this time. In 1879 they took the P&O steamer Siam in company with Titheradge to Melbourne, where both men appeared in the Australian debut of the Kotzebue play False Shame at the Academy of Music (later the "Bijou Theatre"). From 1881–1882 he was successful as agent and manager for the celebrated comedian Fred Marshall, then briefly acting manager of the Princess Theatre.

He was appointed treasurer of Adelaide's Theatre Royal, which he relinquished in 1884 to take over management of that city's refurbished Academy of Music, dubbed the "New Academy", on Rundle Street. The building was destroyed by fire the following year, incurring a great financial loss to Pollock. He then joined James Allison and George Rignold in managing the Adelaide company of Joseph Derrick's play Confusion which toured through Victoria and New South Wales. In 1886 Pollock managed a tour of Western Australia and the Near East by the Webb Marionette Company, then the 1887–88 Australian tour of veteran ventriloquist Fred MacCabe (c.1831–1904). He next managed Harry Rickards's 1888 Australian tour.

In 1889 he turned publican of Her Majesty's Hotel (previously Garton's) in Swanston Street, Melbourne, but did not lose touch with the theatre, acting as a Melbourne agent for Wybert Reeve in Adelaide. Ten years later, after attending the Oakbank races, he left Her Majesty's to manage the bar associated with the Adelaide Theatre Royal. When Reeve retired from stage management in 1900, Pollock purchased the lease from him, and ran the Theatre Royal with considerable tact and ability until forced by illness to step down. He appointed Herbert Myers, a nephew of his wife, as manager. She inherited the theatre, with Myers as her manager until the lease ran out seven years later.

Pollock's chief interests outside the theatre were the turf, his pony "Dandy", his little dogs "Topsy" and "Queenie", and his membership of the Commissionaire Corps of the Volunteer Militia, into which he had been introduced by Reeve. They had a home "Azara" at the corner of Pollock Avenue and Battams Road, Payneham.

== Death ==
Pollock had been in declining health towards the end of his life. On 7 November 1908, Pollock attended a hot air balloon ascension, presumably at the Jubilee Oval, (Note: Pollock's obituary describes him getting sick when he, "went to see the balloon ascend," and did not name a specific event. An article published 5 days prior to his death advertises a hot air balloon ascension by Messrs. O'Donnely & Beebe at the Jubilee Oval for that same date in Adelaide, and it can be assumed that this is the same event.) and caught a cold, eventually passing away 3 days later on 10 November 1908. His remains were buried in the Jewish section of the West Terrace Cemetery.

== Family ==
Pollock married Mary Myers (4 September 1844 – 5 September 1925), of St Georges Terrace, Perth, in Singapore on 5 July 1875 after an engagement of eight years. After his death she married again, to Henry Hele, chief accountant at The Register, in 1908. They had no children.
