= Bellringer =

Bellringer may mean bell-ringer, someone who rings a church or other bell.

Bellringer may also refer to:

== People ==
- Amber Bellringer (born 1990), New Zealand netballer
- Charles Bellringer (1864–1944), New Zealand politician
- Lynch Family bellringers, an Australian musical group

== Fictional characters ==
- Zev Bellringer, fictional character in the television series Lexx

== See also ==
- Change ringing, the musical ringing of bells
- Method ringing, another pattern of ringing bells
- Russian Orthodox bell ringing
- The Australian and New Zealand Association of Bellringers
