= The Record (Melbourne) =

Australian newspaper, 1869–1954

The Record was a weekly newspaper published in South Melbourne, Victoria, from 1869 to at least 1954, serving Port Melbourne, Albert Park, Middle Park, and Garden City.

== History ==
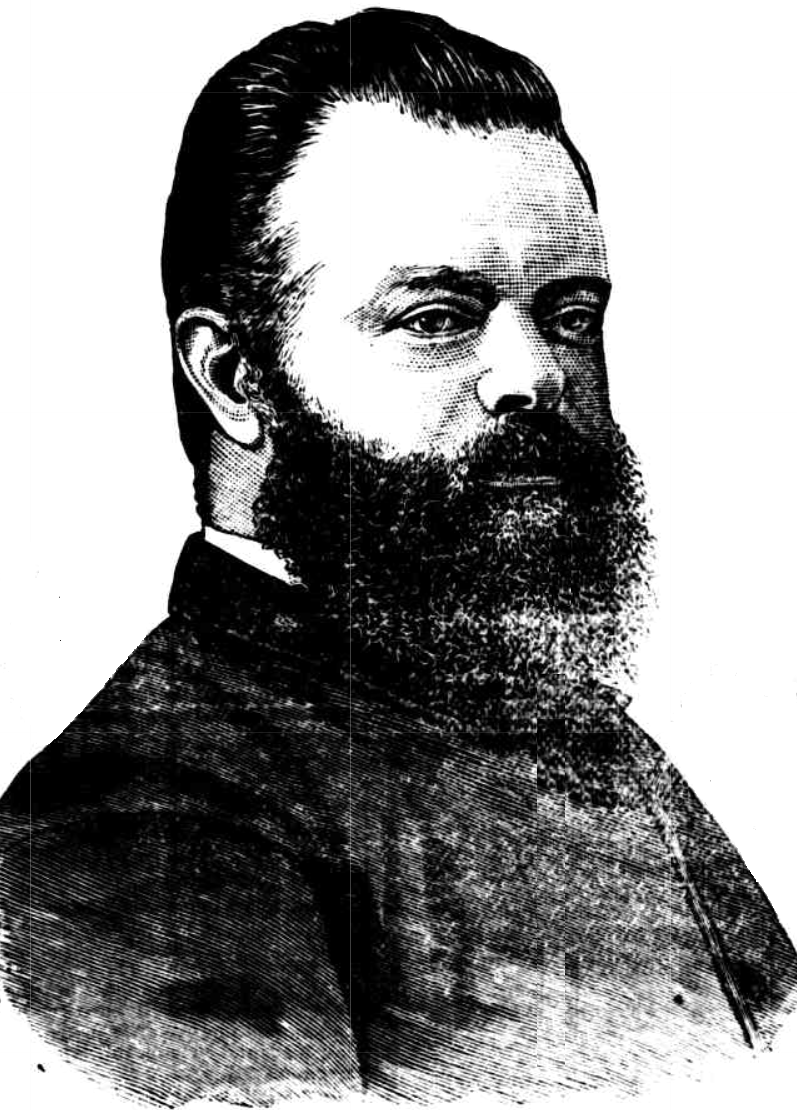
William Marshall

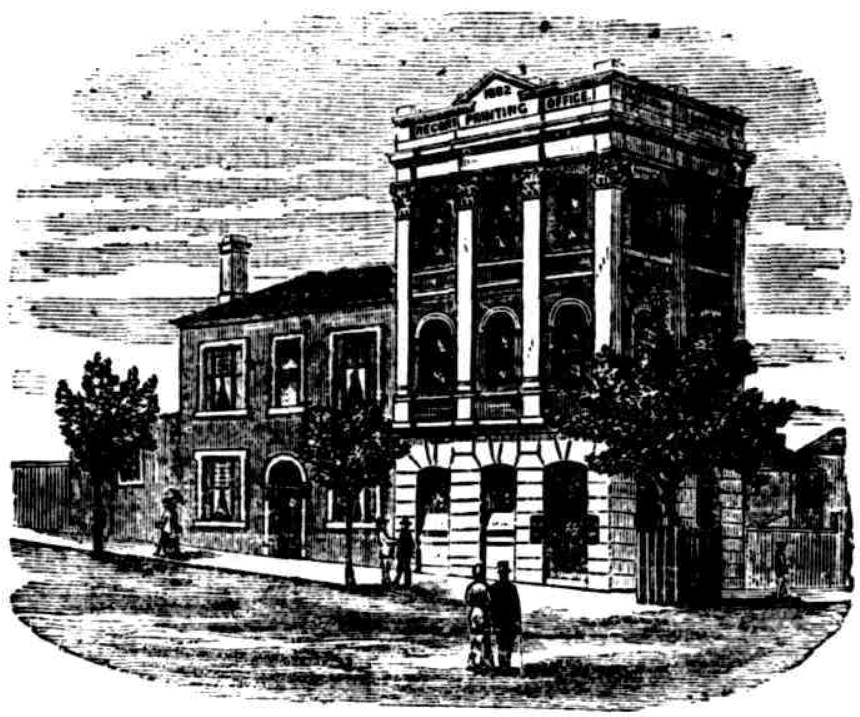
The Record building (1883)

The Record was founded by theatrical printer William Marshall (c. 1845 – 12 June 1900), at Emerald Hill, Victoria (now South Melbourne) after the demise of four other South Melbourne newspapers, Mason & Hill's Emerald Hill Weekly, which first appeared on 28 April 1856, which lasted a year, and its successor R. Mills's Emerald Hill and Sandridge Post, edited by David Blair, and its bitter rival, Morris & Rees's South Melbourne Standard, of which Rev. W. Potter FRGS became editor, then shortly became defunct and was followed by Ferguson and Moore's Courier, edited by James Ward, which also proved unprofitable.

On 6 August 1868, The Record began publication.

In 1878 Marshall purchased the business and printery of The Lorgnette, a theatre programme guide, and continued running both businesses. Under Marshall it had been renamed The Emerald Hill and Sandridge Record or The Record and Emerald Hill and Sandridge Advertiser. In 1880 Marshall purchased the Melbourne firm of Charlwood & Son, and in 1881 sold the business to a local consortium, who appointed the aforesaid Rev. Potter as manager.

In 1872, The Record changed its name to The Record and Emerald Hill and Sandridge Advertiser, reverting to The Record in 1881.

In 1882 a building designed by architect S. W. Smith, was erected for the business, which was then purchased by Potter. In 1893 he became insolvent after disposing of his assets through a complex "round robin" of children and his future wife. He died a year later in a buggy accident.

The last issue of The Record was published on 22 December 1954.

== Publication ==
In 1881 it was published on Saturdays at the office of "The Record" Newspaper Company, 28 Dorcas Street East, Emerald Hill (now South Melbourne), and consisted of four pages, price 1d. (one penny).

In 1954 it was published on Saturdays at the office of C. J. Meehan, of Wynward Street, South Melbourne, and consisted of eight pages, price 3d. (three pence).

== Digitisation ==
The National Library of Australia has digitised photographic copies of most issues from of 1 April 1881 to 22 December 1954, which may be examined via Trove.
