= Boothroyd Fairclough =

American actor (1825–1911)

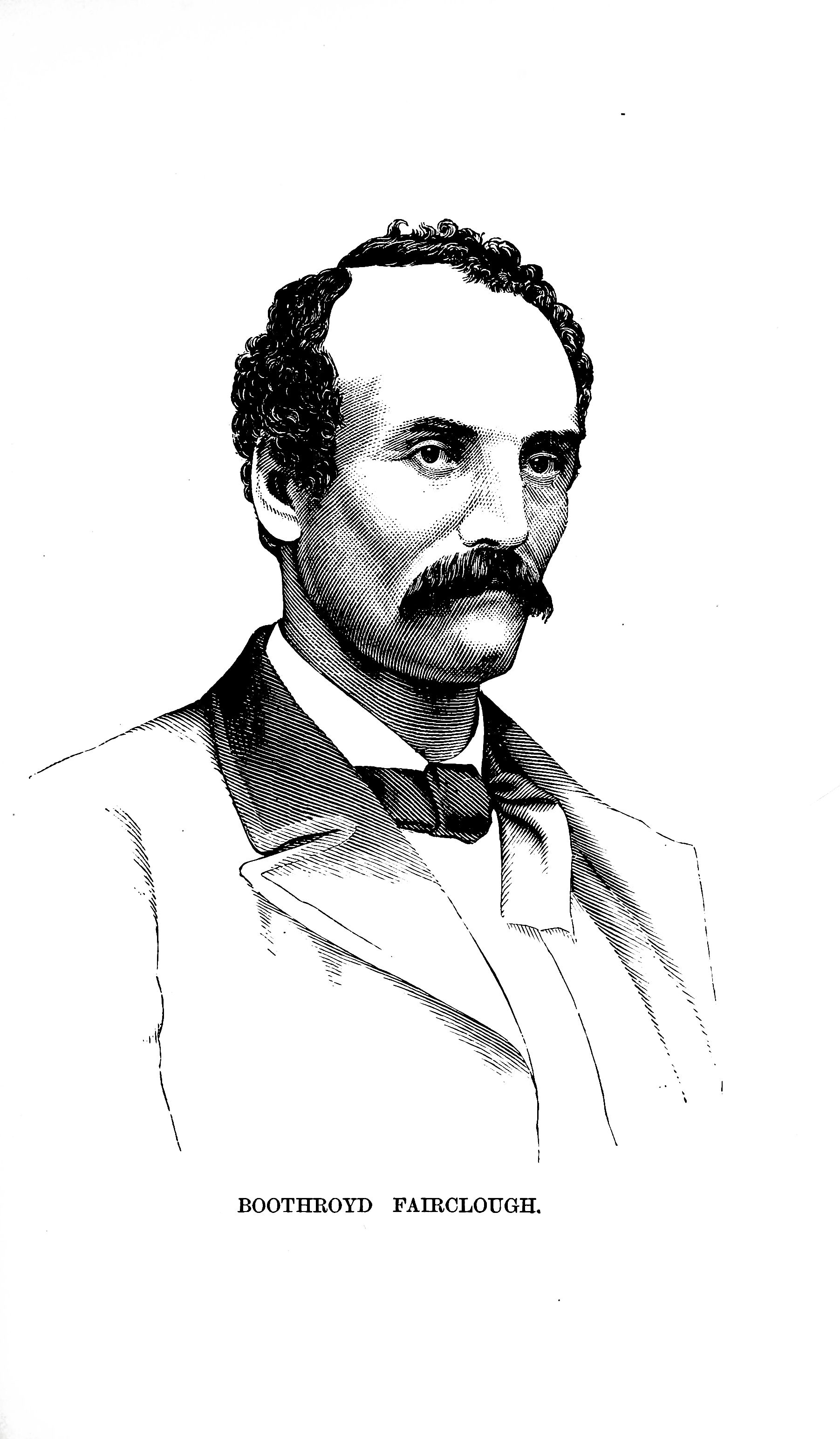
Boothroyd Fairclough

Boothroyd Fairclough (c. 1825 – 18 September 1911) was an American actor, known for playing Shakespearean tragedies.

== History ==
Fairclough was born 1824 or 1825 in Lancashire, the younger son of William Fairclough (died November 1865), and educated at the Manchester Grammar School. He emigrated with his parents to America, and made his acting debut in 1850 at the People Theatre in St Louis under the stage name "Emmet". In 1856 he made his New York debut in the City Museum as Iago, which became his most popular role, and was engaged in that venue for some time. At some stage he was working for the Booth family.

He was involved in the American Civil War (1861–1865) but more information is needed.

In a season at Vicksburg in January 1866 he played Othello, Richard III and Hamlet, as well as Richelieu in Edward Bulwer-Lytton's play, and "Sir Edward Mortimer" in W. B. Bernard's The Four Sisters, then on his return in November that year, the male lead in J. B. Buckstone's Kiss in the Dark, Philip Massinger's A New Way to Pay Old Debts, George Colman the Younger's The Iron Chest and John Brougham's Po-ca-hon-tas.

In 1868 he made his London debut, playing Hamlet at the Lyceum Theatre.

=== Australia ===
In December 1872 H. R. Harwood, manager of the Theatre Royal, Melbourne, just returned from London searching for talent, candidly confessed that he had been unable to secure any "stars" for the coming season, except at "ruinous prices", and would have to make the best of the "home article". He had however contracted some of the "second magnitude", including Fairclough, Madame Legrand, Mr and Mrs Belton, and Mr and Mrs Dampier. Fairclough must have been playing in London for some months, as the Melbourne Leader found a good number of positive reviews from prominent UK newspapers.

Fairclough and Le Grande arrived in Melbourne on the Lincolnshire and opened with Hamlet at the Theatre Royal on 10 March 1873; he was judged by one critic the best in the part since Walter Montgomery.

Richard the Third followed, and Othello to a lukewarm reception from critics. Fairclough created a scandal by refusing to play on the same stage as one Alfred Penrhyn, stagename Guyon, who he claimed was the same person as a notorious female impersonator known as Park, of Boulton and Park notoriety. Penrhyn sued for slander.

His tour of Australia finished with his second visit to Adelaide, which began with Hamlet at the Theatre Royal on 4 October 1875, a performance which received unreserved praise. After a successful tour of country centres, his last appearances were a reading from Henry V at the Theatre Royal on Christmas Eve, which was appreciated by the few who attended, but could not compete with the rowdier attractions of the "US Minstrels" at White's Rooms, and a complimentary performance at the Yatala Labor Prison.

=== South Africa ===
Fairclough left Adelaide at the end of March 1876 for Cape Town, where he was billed as "the eminent tragedian from Australia and London". He did a series of performances with the Cagli Italian Opera Company, then had a three-week season with Disney Roebuck presenting Shakespeare at the new Theatre Royal in Burg Street and the Athenaeum Hall, Nieuw Street, Cape Town (Note: The Athenaeum was another name for Hutchinson's Hall, a venue in Nieuw Street, Cape Town, built around 1778, and used as a performance venue by amateur companies.) where he reprised his old roles of "Hamlet", "Richelieu" and "Mortimer" to excellent reviews. On 4 July a "Grand Complimentary Benefit" (to Fairclough?) was held, under the aegis of the Governor, to which Fairclough contributed, reciting poetry ("Shamus O'Brien", "The Charge of the Light Brigade", etc.). Other performers were Signora Neri and Signor Greco, singing popular arias, accompanied by Mr Darter on piano. The programme was repeated on 26 July, when Fairclough performed scenes from Hamlet and Macbeth. He also performed a series of sacred readings in the Athenaeum Hall from 6 August onwards.

He then headed for the interior and the diamond fields of the Kimberley, but the response to his readings from Shakespeare was less than overwhelming.

=== The East ===
Fairclough married Elsa May and in 1878 the pair embarked on a tour to San Francisco via Bombay, Hong Kong and Yokohama, giving recitals in those cities. Fairclough and May returned to Australia in 1880 stopping at Mackay in February and Rockhampton, Maryborough and Ipswich in March, giving recitals. A promised performance in Brisbane had to be cancelled when the only suitable hall was preemptively booked by an opposing entrepreneur and left vacant for the nights in question. She was billed as "Elcia May" throughout this period.

=== UK ===
They moved to London where they joined Sir George Alexander's touring company.

Fairclough died at his residence in Gower street, London, on 18 September 1911.

== Personal ==
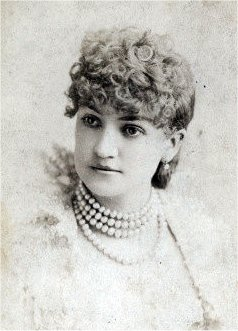
Le Grande in the 1880s

Fairclough married Isabella Cameron and had seven children between 1857 and 1870, about whom nothing further has been found. He was subsequently associated with two actresses:

=== Eugénie Le Grande ===
He took as a lover the Parisian actress Eugénie Marie Seraphié Le Grande, by whom he may have had a son (perhaps Octave Lincoln Fairclough), born on board the passenger ship Lincolnshire on 15 January 1873. She married Harold Kyrle Money Bellew (as "Harold Dominick Bellew") on 27 October 1873 and she promptly returned to Fairclough. How long this attachment continued has not yet been found.

Bellew formally divorced her in 1888 and never remarried; she promptly then married pastoralist Hector Alexander Wilson, (Note: Hector was a wealthy pastoralist and eldest son of wealthy pastoralist and sometime politician Alexander Wilson) but continued touring. She is reported in 1893 as having one daughter; elsewhere he is reported as having one son and one daughter, aged 17 and 15 respectively. Wilson died on 9 January 1893, age 42, and left her his entire estate valued at £27,147, many tens of millions in today's values. Le Grande and her daughter were present at his death, as was her sister, Madame E. Geradin, and her husband, "a Parisian painter of some eminence".

See also Kyrle Bellew

=== Elsa May (c. 1860 – ) ===
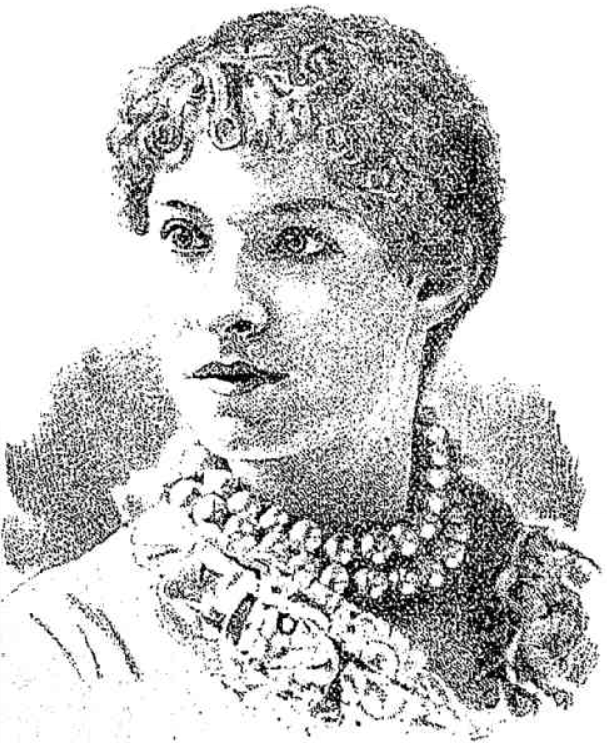
Elsa May

Fairclough married Elsa May in Sydney in 1878 or perhaps earlier.

May was an operatic soprano singer, who has been called Australia's first prima donna. (Note: Not to be confused with Elsa May Fischer, daughter of Hugo Fischer (–1901), a soprano known as Elsa Stralia) May made her debut at the Melbourne Opera House in Balfe's Satanella on 25 April 1880, and was praised for her sweetness of voice, and a range to D in alt (D_{6}). This was followed by The Grand Duchess on 1 May and Lecocq's La Fille de Madame Angot at the same venue.

Their daughter was born in June 1880. Around this time they had a home at 9 Elgin Street, Carlton, Victoria.

Husband and wife gave occasional popular drama and music recitals.

She joined the Simpson Opera Company for their New Zealand tour in 1890. In May 1891 she made her London debut at the Victoria Hall in Robert Macaire In 1895 she joined the Pioneer Opera Company touring England. In 1899 she played in The American Beauty for Sir George Musgrove.

Their daughter, May Fairclough (25 June 1880 – ), became an actor of some note. In 1904 she was playing at St James's Theatre, London for George Alexander.
