= Albert Hall, Adelaide =

Public entertainment venue

The Albert Hall in Adelaide was a public entertainment venue in Pirie Street, built for the Adelaide German Club in 1880 and sold to the Salvation Army in 1899.

Among users of the hall was the Garrick Club, which staged several productions in 1889 and 1890, including an operetta Dimple's Lovers written by Guy Boothby and Cecil Sharp.

== Background ==
The building, which cost £2,000 was paid for by fund-raising activities, mostly by the members' wives, and by every member contributing £1, which was to be repaid, interest free, out of profits.

Fundraising began almost immediately, with a concert by the Adelaide Liedertafel in October 1880.

The building was purchased from the German Freehold Company, Ltd., managers of the property, by the Salvation Army for £4,000 in September 1898, and became Headquarters Memorial Hall.
