= Lion Brewing and Malting Company =

Beer brewing company based in South Australia

The Lion Brewing and Malting Company of Jerningham Street, Lower North Adelaide was one of the many breweries which proliferated in Australia in the nineteenth century.

== History ==
The company's name derives from its establishment in North Adelaide, the Lion Hotel, which was built around 1881–3 on the corner of Melbourne Street and Jerningham Street.

The company was floated in 1888 in order to secure the brewing, hotel and property assets of Beaglehole and Johnston, issuing 75,000 shares of £1 each. The company owned many hotels in South Australia, including the Cross Keys Hotel at Dry Creek (and subdivided around 20 acres adjacent in 1912), the Flagstaff Hotel, Darlington, the Oriental Hotel in Osmond Terrace, Norwood and the Bath Hotel at 91 King William Street in the city. Later in the 20th century it became a shareholder in another major hotel owner, Knapman and Sons, and bought out that company in 1973.

Lion Brewing and Malting eventually confined itself to malting barley and manufacture of aerated waters and cordials.

== Notable people ==
=== Johnston brothers ===
Andrew Galbraith Johnston (1827 – 18 December 1886), James Johnston (1818 – 12 April 1891) and three other brothers, all of Campbeltown, Scotland, arrived in South Australia on the Buckinghamshire early in 1839 with their father, who soon built one of South Australia's first malthouses and founded the town of Oakbank. He served a ten-year apprenticeship as a draper, then opened a shop in Reedy Creek which he left for the goldfields. He was quite successful and with his brother James, after a brief stint as a miller in Bridgewater, joined his father's brewing business and together built it into a highly profitable business.

Robert Cock, a "first settler" who accompanied Governor Hindmarsh on HMS Buffalo, and for whom Cox's Creek was named, has been reported as founder of the malting business. and had a substantial farm in the area.

James Johnston was one of the best-known men in the south, as his firm had business connections and valuable hotel property in all the principal centres of the district. He took an active interest in the politics of the Onkaparinga district and was generous in his support of the Woodside and Mount Barker Institutes. He was one of the founders of the Mount Barker Agricultural Society (missing only one of its first 44 annual shows) and with his brother Andrew was an active promoter of the Onkaparinga Racing Club (now Oakbank Racing Club), and its Great Eastern Steeplechase, first run in 1876. He was an enthusiastic proponent of "acclimatisation of useful species" and stocked the district about his home with Californian quail, and filled the Onkaparinga with perch. He married Margaret "Minnie" Disher (died 11 April 1900), a sister of Eliza, Lady Milne. The Disher family arrived in Adelaide aboard Palmyra in October 1839.

James's son John Disher Johnston (1850–1916) was a partner in the brewery. Another son, James Steele Johnston (1870 – 22? May 1892) was partner in the Broken Hill, New South Wales brewing firm of Simpson, Johnston and Co.

=== F. A. Chapman ===
Frederick Arthur Chapman (10 March 1864 – 18 September 1925) was born in Stepney, South Australia, the son of Arthur Chapman, one of Adelaide's best-known hotel brokers. He was educated at Grote Street State School, J. L. Young's Adelaide Educational Institution and Prince Alfred College. He entered the brewing trade as an apprentice under Mr. G. Gray at the Lion Brewery and remained with the company all his life. At 18 be was sent out as a traveller, and became acquainted with most aspects of hotel management. He worked in every branch of the trade and at the age of 25 he was appointed company secretary. By then the company had ceased brewing to concentrate on production of malt, aerated beverages and cordials. His duties took him periodically to Sydney, Brisbane, and Perth, where the company had customers for its malt among the leading breweries.

He was for some time secretary of the South Australian Associated Brewers and the Brewers' Association. On many occasions he represented the brewing interest at conferences and in Arbitration Court cases. He was a director of the Cooperative Bottle Company, and was for a time chairman of the finance committee of the Chamber of Manufacturers.

For six years he was a member of the Church of England Synod's financial board, and for many years a synodsman and lay reader of the church.

He was a prominent Freemason and a member of the Commercial Travellers' Association for over 30 years.

Chapman died of a heart attack on the Melbourne Express on his way to Victoria where he was to holiday with his brother, L. Chapman of Western Australia. He left a widow Marian (née Kingsborough), two sons: Dr. A. Chapman (superintendent of the Adelaide Dental Hospital) and Mr. S. Chapman (secretary of the Lion Brewing Company) and a daughter, Elma Chapman.

=== S. I. Chapman ===
Stanley Irwin Chapman (1892 –29 September 1940), a son of F. A. Chapman, was educated at St. Peter's College, then worked for some years with Burns, Philp and Company Ltd. in New Guinea. When war broke out in 1914 he joined the navy, and on return to Sydney transferred to the army as staff sergeant. After the war he joined Lion Brewing and eventually succeeded his father as manager.
