= Lynch Family bellringers =

Australian bellringers

The Lynch Family was a family group of bell-ringers formed in Victoria, Australia, in 1867. They toured almost continuously until 1926, led first by the father Henry, then by the eldest son, both known as Harry Lynch.

== History ==
According to one report Henry and five sons emigrated from Bristol in 1859, bringing with them a large set of handbells. All other reports had four sons. Another has Henry, his wife and one son emigrating in the early 1850s, the other three sons being born in Victoria, eventually settling in Bond Street, Chilwell, near Geelong. Lynch trained his sons in the art of handbell ringing and they made their first public performance in the old Mechanics' Hall, Geelong on 25 August 1867. This was followed by a season at the Polytechnic Hall, Bourke Street, Melbourne.

The Lancashire Bellringers, a team of eight who toured Australia for George Coppin in the years 1863–1870, gave encouragement to local groups, both handbell and belfry ringing. Lynch was inspired to import a set of 40 handbells from Mears and Stainbank in 1868. These instruments, being a tenor set, were of deeper tone than the Lancashires', and said to be of a higher quality.

Handbells constructed for this purpose have a spring-mounted striker, such that it produces a single note by a deft flick of the wrist and cannot ring accidentally. Players may each operate one or two bells in each hand or pick up the required bells from the table as the music dictates.
Bells slowly lose their tone and with constant use may need replacement after ten or twelve years. Pitch of the bells is dependent on temperature, perhaps a semitone higher in cold weather and lower in the tropics.

Initially styling themselves "The Australian Bellringers", their repertoire was vast and varied, and they were, if anything, more proficient players, but did not receive the same "star" treatment as the imports. They did however make a number of successful tours of Australia and six or eight of New Zealand. Their first tour was to Sydney in 1868, stopping at every large town on the way, giving three or four performances before moving on, through Queensland, reaching Townsville in 1870, followed by New Zealand that same year. The first tour to Adelaide was made in 1871, playing at White's Rooms, followed by Western Australia.

=== Overseas tour ===
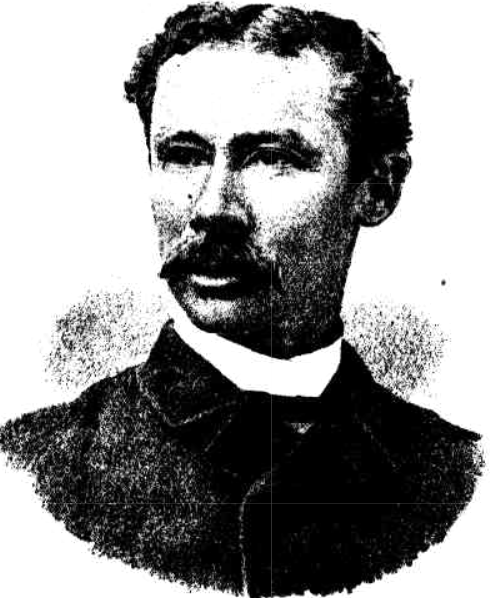
Harry Lynch in 1889

Henry Lynch retired in 1876 or 1883 and Harry Jr took over on the eve of their planned world tour. Leaving Fremantle for Ceylon and India with a cast of supporting acts, their ship Macedon, Captain Craig, was wrecked on the Transit Reef, Rottnest Island, on 21 March 1883, losing everything but their precious set of bells. Generous friends donated clothing and other goods and they were able to resume their tour. The first critique of their act to appear in The Times of India was written by an unknown young journalist named Rudyard Kipling. Several of their party died of smallpox in India. The tour included Hong Kong, Japan, the Philippines, Burma, and the Straits Settlements, and were well received in each country. In Java a cholera epidemic was raging, so that visit was cut short. All told, they spent seven years in Asia before again settling in Australia.

=== Later years ===
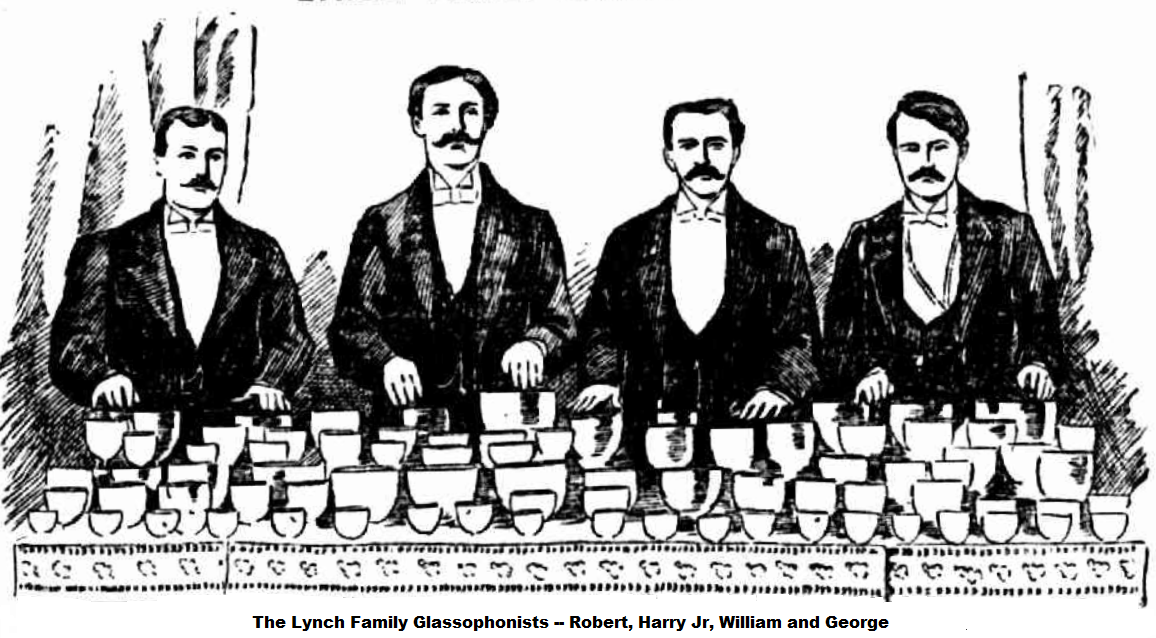
The Lynch Family in 1894

The Lynch Family extended their programmes to include pieces played on the "Glassophone", a series of fine glass vessels, each tuned by adding a quantity of water, and made to sing by lightly stroking the rim. Later instruments were the "aluminium organ" (a set of tubular bells) and "marimba resonator".

They disbanded after 20 years and Robert Lynch formed his own company in 1909 with two sons and a daughter. They were still playing under the "Lynch Family" name in 1929.

=== Associates ===
Appearing with the Lynch Family was Irish comic J. S. Farron, who died from tuberculosis 7 July 1887. His remains were buried at Rookwood alongside "Professor" (George) Alfred Statham, pianist and composer with the Lynch Family who died 9 September 1886. J. S. Farron had much in common with T. J. (Thomas Joseph) Farron of "Baker and Farron" fame.

== Family ==
Henry "Harry" Lynch (6 April 1822 – 20 or 21 May 1906) perhaps married to Eliza Mary Ann Lynch (died August 1916)

- Harry Lynch (c. 1847 – 3 September 1926) had home on Canning Street, Carlton
- Robert R. Lynch (c. 1852 – 27 March 1926)
  - Roy Lynch
  - G. A. H. Lynch
  - Ruby M. Lynch

They had a home "Cartmell" in Hawksburn, Victoria

- George Lynch (c. 1857 – 6 July 1909) died at Alma Villa, Commercial Road, South Yarra.
- William Lynch (c. 1858 – c. 5 June 1945)
  - W. H. Lynch

The remains of Henry Lynch were buried in the family plot, Geelong Cemetery.
