= Theatre Royal, Adelaide =

Former theatre in Adelaide, Australia

Coordinates: 34°55′22″S 138°35′54″E

The Theatre Royal on Hindley Street, Adelaide was a significant venue in the history of the stage and cinema in South Australia. After a small predecessor of the same name on Franklin Street (built 1838), the Theatre Royal on Hindley Street was built in 1868. It hosted both stage performances and movies, passing through several changes of ownership before it was eventually demolished to make way for a multi-storey car park in 1962.

== History ==
=== 19th century ===
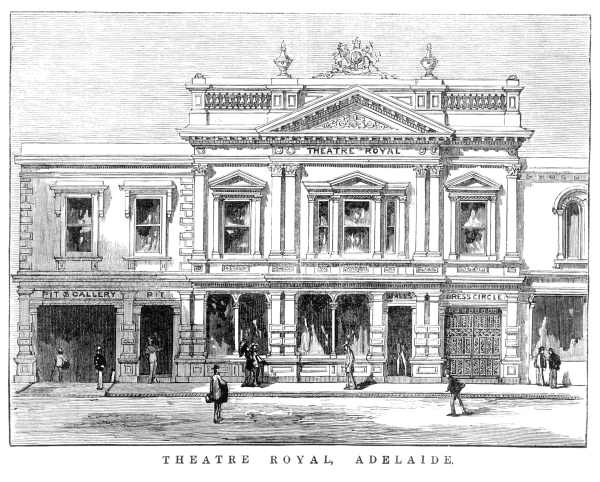

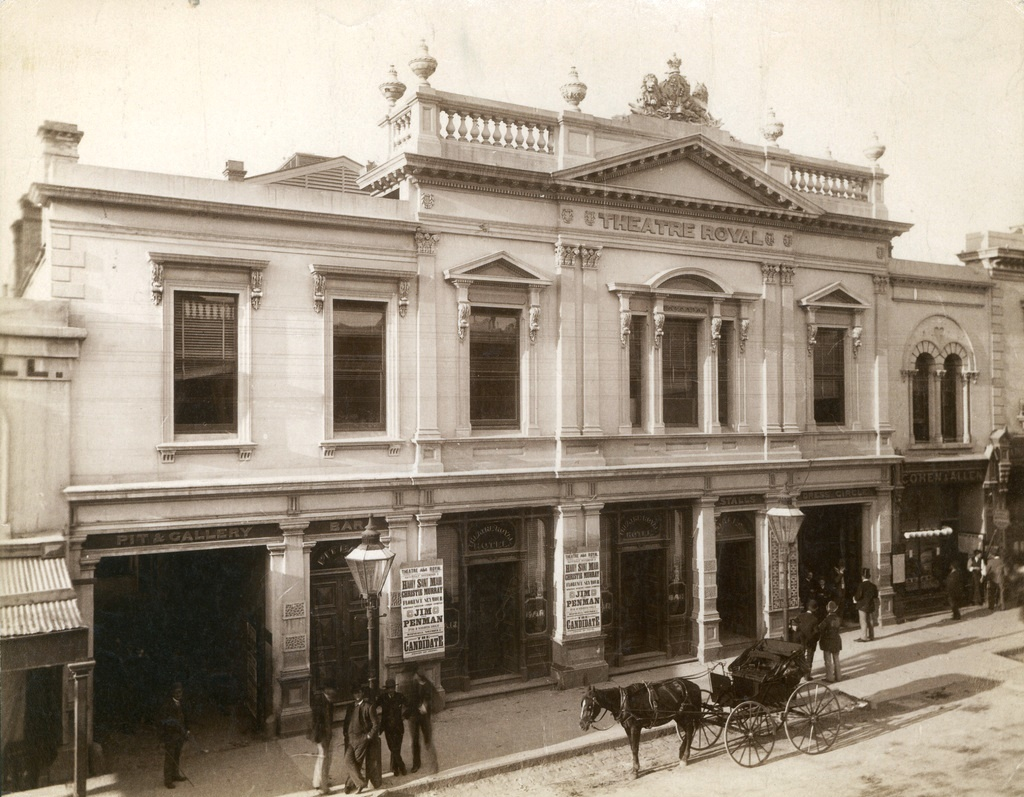
Theatre Royal, Hindley Street, Adelaide c. 1886. Pit and gallery entrance via lane at left, dress circle by the wide entrance far right, stalls by the narrow door to its left.

The first "Theatre Royal" in Adelaide was a small venue above the Adelaide Tavern in Franklin Street, managed by a Mr Bonnar, and was opened in May 1838. The first production staged there was Mountaineers, or, Love and Madness (Colman). Bonnar was succeeded as manager by Sampson Marshall. This was eclipsed in 1841 by the opening of the Queen's Theatre on Gilles Arcade, off Currie Street, and the old theatre was remodelled as a Commercial Exchange. In December 1850 the Royal Victoria Theatre (later Queen's) opened, also on Gilles Arcade, with Coppin and Samuel Lazar joint managers.

In December 1865 a prospectus was issued in Adelaide for a Theatre Royal company to take over White's Assembly Rooms and the adjacent Clarence Hotel, alternatively to purchase a vacant site and erect a new building. By December 1867 plans had been prepared for a new structure to be added to the rear of Peter Cummings & Son's drapery store at 21 Hindley Street, Leonard Voullaire's at 23 (then was the financially troubled Paull & Meredith's wine bar 1868–1870), and Mrs Bament's at 27. Paull & Meredith had a wine bar. Thomas English was chosen as supervising architect and W. Lines the builder. The proprietors were Lazar, John Temple Sagar, and Jochim Matthias Wendt. The foundation stone was laid by owner of the property Henry Fuller on 8 January 1868, and the At the foundation ceremony, Fuller, then Mayor of Adelaide, said that it would replace the "inferior" Royal Victoria as Adelaide's principal theatre. Seating 1300, it opened as Adelaide's second major theatre.

The first performance was held on 13 April 1868 (Easter Monday), a production of All that Glitters is not Gold by John Norton.

Edgar Chapman became owner of the property shortly afterwards, and it remained in his family for some time. The first lessee and director was George Coppin of Coppin, Harwood and Hennings, with stage manager J. R. Greville (1834–1894), a noted comedian.

Lazar was lessee and manager from 1870, for a time in partnership with one Reuben Mills, suspended while his liquidity was being sorted out, then sole lessee from 1871. James Allison joined him as partner in 1873, became sole lessee around 1876.

In October 1876 Edgar Chapman purchased the Theatre Royal, its hotel and the adjoining shops for £11,000, and lost no time in appointing George Johnson architect for a complete rebuild of the theatre. Enlarged to accommodate 3,000 patrons, the theatre became the first example of Victorian theatrical interior design in Adelaide. The rebuilt house was opened on 25 March 1878 with an address written by Ebenezer Ward, followed by the opera Giroflé-Girofla with Emily Soldene, Minna Fischer and Clara Vesey. These first few years were the heyday of musical theatre.

In 1883 external fire stairs were erected in response to demands from the City Council.

In January 1885 Arthur Chapman, a brother of the owner, joined George Rignold and James Allison as co-lessees; Chapman being the local representative. In December Rignold and Allison withdrew from the partnership, leaving Chapman as sole trustee, as well as acting as managing the property for the ailing Edgar Chapman, and then for his estate. He continued in both roles April 1886, when Williamson, Garner, & Musgrove took over the lease, and on 1887 appointed Wybert Reeve as manager.

Around 1889 Reeve became sole lessee of the theatre. On 19 October 1896 he hosted the first public demonstration in South Australia of moving pictures, the projector being a cinématographe Lumière. A number of short films, around a minute in length and featuring dancers and American folk heroes, were shown. However, the venue was deemed unsuitable as a cinema, and the screening apparatus was moved to the Beehive Building not long afterwards.

=== 20th century ===
Wybert Reeve retired from management in 1900, and sold the lease to Frederick Pollock, who managed the theatre capably until forced by illness to take on Herbert Myers (1879–1927), his wife's nephew, as manager. Pollock died in November 1908, and his wife continued to run it in partnership with Myers.

The theatre was further enlarged and updated in 1914 under James Williamson, who reopened on 11 April that year and continued to run the theatre for around 50 years. William Pitt was commissioned by the manager George Tallis. Pitt's design included a proscenium arch in order to improve the acoustics, and lengthening of both the auditorium and the exterior facade. Interior decor was in Louis XV period style. In 1918 the theatre hosted the premiere of The Woman Suffers, an Australian silent film directed by Raymond Longford.

Myers purchased the lease in December 1921, and in 1920 purchased the property from the Chapman estate. Myers, before his death in 1927, sold a half-share in the theatre to Sir George Tallis of Melbourne, who later sold a quarter interest of his share to the Tait family business. (Theatre entrepreneur Frank Tait had worked for J. C. Williamson's from 1900 until 1916, when he joined J. & N. Tait in Sydney.)

In March 1934, a "physical culture demonstration" was performed at the theatre by Weber, Shorthose & Rice.

Before or around November 1934, the Waterman family created S.A. Theatres Ltd, a subsidiary of their Ozone Theatres, for the purpose of taking on the lease of the Theatre Royal, and for creating the Chinese Gardens open-air theatre at the Exhibition Grounds on North Terrace Both theatres would show the same MGM films at both venues.

During the war years, the Theatre Royal ran an orchestra, in which the mother of QC Ted Mullighan played violin.

Tallis died in 1947. Myers' half share was inherited by his widow, Dora Myers, who was still alive when in January 1954 the Tallis estate sold its interest to J. C. Williamson's, which had been leasing the theatre, with the lease expiring in that month.

At an auction on 6 May 1955, department store Miller Anderson & Co. bought the Theatre Royal for £175,000 and took over the properties between the Theatre Royal and Gresham Street, and erected a five-storey building. They demolished the theatre in 1962 to build an "exceptionally ugly" multi-level car park.

== Notable performers ==
The many live shows hosted at the Theatre Royal, performers included:

- Vivian Leigh
- Katharine Hepburn
- The Bolshoi Ballet (on its final closing night)

== See also ==
- Theatre Royal, Melbourne
- Theatre Royal, Sydney
- Theatre Royal, Hobart
