= James Allison (theatre) =

Australian theatre manager

James Allison (1831 – 12 January 1890) was a theatre manager in Sydney, Adelaide and Melbourne. He engaged and managed local and overseas opera, drama, circus, minstrel and variety companies throughout the Australasian colonies.

== History ==
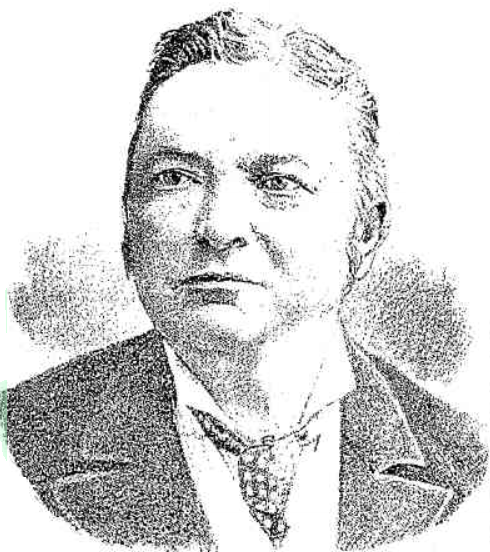
James Allison

Allison was by trade a tailor, at which he worked for about 12 years, and had a shop in Castlereagh Street, Sydney.

He was somehow associated with Harry Rickards' first visit to Australia in 1871.

He may have worked as a travelling salesman for F. E. Hiscocks and Co. of Melbourne, publishers of Australian atlases from 1874. but was associated with Fred Hiscocks and Samuel Lazar from at least 1875 when they were operating the Queen's Theatre, Sydney, and managed Mr. and Mrs. J. C. Williamson's first Sydney appearance. When Lazar took the Williamsons to Melbourne and Adelaide in July 1875 Allison "held the fort" in Sydney as treasurer. Lazar had been lessee and manager of the Theatre Royal, Adelaide since 1870; Allison joined in that management in 1873 and became sole lessee around 1876. It was in that year he made his first visit to America, arranging for George Rignold to visit the colonies with his grand production of "Henry V.," and introduced to Australia the popular comedian, Fred Thorne.

After Edgar Chapman rebuilt the Theatre Royal in 1878 he charged Allison a modest £25 or £30 a week rent. From the renewal of the lease Allison was being charged something like £45 or £50 a week, then charging the touring companies £90, a substantial profit for very little risk. When Allison was preparing to leave for England in 1883 he on-sold the business for £90 a week to a Melbourne speculator, who charged the companies £160–£170, thus putting Adelaide out of the running for any but second-rate acts.

Allison continued as sole lessee of the Adelaide Theatre Royal until 1883, when he took on George Rignold as a partner (Arthur Chapman would be added as a third partner and local manager in 1885), freeing him to visit America and England early in 1884, and amongst other attractions he introduced to Australia Miss Jeffreys-Lewis, who made her first appearance at the Theatre Royal, Melbourne as "Fedora", on 17 May 1884. Allison was also associated with Hiscocks and William Marshall in the erection of the Victoria Hall, Melbourne, but retired from that partnership just prior to his 1884 American visit. He also secured the rights of several comic operas (Falka, Nell Gwynne) to be staged at the Opera House, Melbourne, which Rignold and Allison also managed, commencing with In the Ranks on 25 October 1884.

In 1882 they secured a long lease on a site in Pitt Street, Sydney, and formed a company for the purpose of founding Her Majesty's Theatre, which Rignold and Allison opened on 10 September 1887.

Allison and Rignold dissolved their partnership; Allison was in financial difficulties, and a benefit organised to alleviate his difficulties gained little public support. In September 1899 Allison left for America to arrange for the shipping of the Wild West Show which he had organised in conjunction with John Solomon and J. B. Gaylord, and to sign other attractions for Australia. Immediately after his arrival in America he was informed of the sudden death of his wife in Paddington, Sydney.

Allison died of pneumonia in the German Hospital, San Francisco, and was buried in that city, funeral rites being held at the First Congregational Church.

By his death two orphans (a boy and a girl) were left, and very ill-provided for.

== Family ==
James Allison married Ellen Jane Murray (c. 1856 – 18 October 1889). His second wife, she died at Paddington, New South Wales. Their two children were born at 2, North Terrace, Adelaide.

- James Murray Allison (9 October 1877 – )
- Nellie Maud Allison (24 September 1879 – )

His first wife died at Emerald Hill (South Melbourne).
