= Wybert Reeve =

English actor and impresario

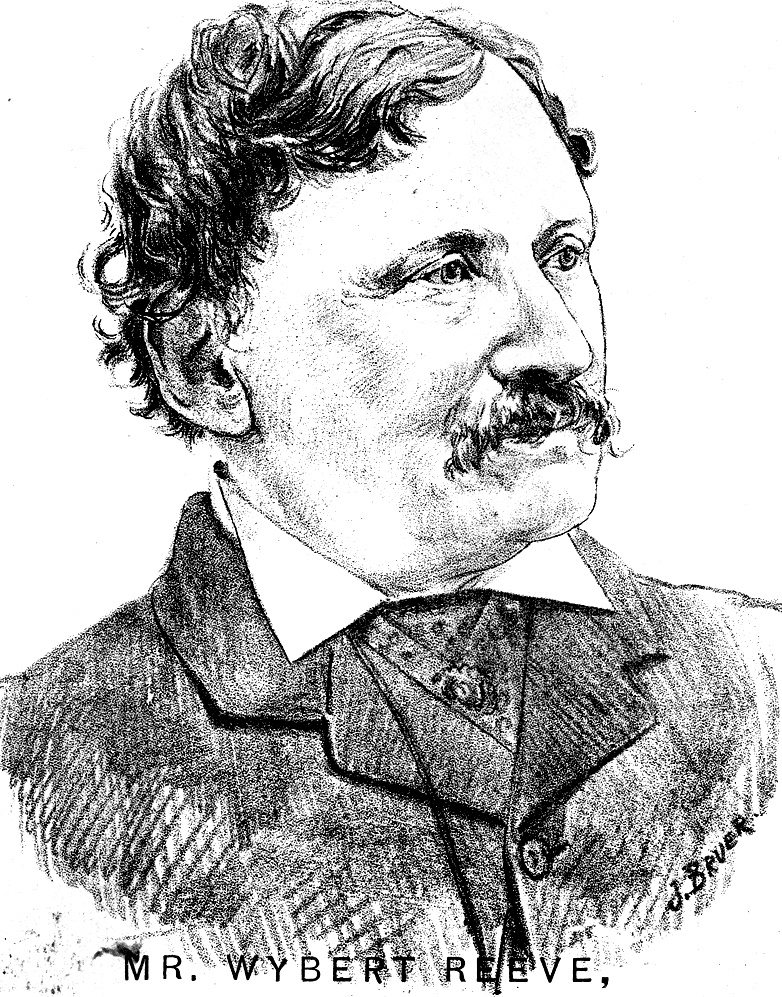
- Born: c. 1831; London

Wybert Reeve (c. 1831 – 21 November 1906) was an English actor and impresario, important in the history of the theatre in South Australia.

== History ==
Reeve was born in London, the only child of well-to-do parents who died when he was around five years of age, and he was placed under the guardianship of a grandfather, who appears to have been a bit of a tyrant. In this household was an old and trusted servant, who took the boy to the Theatre Royal, Drury Lane, Adelphi and other London theatres, where he saw William Macready in The Tempest and the Guy Fawkes pantomime, to name two performances he recalled many years later. Around the age of 11 or 12, Reeve took to sneaking out of the house by the servants' entrance in order to witness stage productions. On one occasion he was discovered by a servant, but his intransigence was not reported to his grandfather. In fact there appears to have been no love lost between Reeve and any of his family, save only an uncle, a parson of Bristol. As a young man, Reeve joined in amateur performances at the homes of friends, and thereby got to meet a son of Sir Edwin Landseer and the daughters of one Cooper, a Royal Academician, (perhaps Richard Cooper, Jr?).

At age 17 a commission in either the 3rd Dragoon Guards or the 5th Dragoon Guards was procured for him, and he was stationed at the Piershill Barracks, but the regimented life of a soldier was not for him, and he resigned a year later to become an actor. The relatives were furious at his ingratitude and, apart from the vicar mentioned, broke off all contact and never saw him again. He joined a professional company under the usual conditions for an aspiring actor in those days — no pay and provide your own wardrobe — and was given bit parts. While staying at Bradford, where he had his first engagement, he met the actors James Anderson and Mrs. Warner, who were at the same hotel. The great tragedian earnestly advised him to abandon all thoughts of the stage; advice ignored of course. Shortly afterwards Reeve was given the part of "Frederick", the walking gentleman in The Wonder, a comedy by Susanna Centlivre. Reeve unfortunately forgot his lines, and thenceforth was reduced to walk-on non-speaking parts, with no prospect of advancement, so the aspiring "Hamlet" and "Young Norval" left and found another manager, in Whitehaven, Cumberland, under the same terms — nothing a week and find your own wardrobe.

Undeterred, Reeve continued to pursue his ambition, and steadily worked his way up the ladder.

In 1852, in Plymouth, as the outcome of a bet, Reeve wrote a farce, An Australian Hoax which, to win the wager, he had in production within a week and on the stage in ten days. Gold discoveries in Australia were making the news at the time, but it is a curious fact that within a few years he would be there making his fortune, but on the stage. He wrote another farce, Supper Gratis in 1855. In that year he joined the Bath and Bristol Company, then the Theatre Royal Company at Manchester in 1857, and played four successive seasons with them. After five years of touring he decided to try his hand at stage management, and successively mounted productions at Cardiff, Swansea, Ryde, Sheffield, South Shields, and Scarborough in 1867, which he ran for two years.

In October 1869 he made his first personal appearance on the London stage as "John Mildmay" in Tom Taylor's Still Waters Run Deep at the Lyceum Theatre, followed by "Count Fosco" in Wilkie Collins's The Woman in White (from the book of the same name) at the Olympic Theatre, the role for which he was best known. In 1873 he supported Collins on his reading tour of North America and appeared as Fosco on Broadway. He would eventually play the part in England, America, and the Colonies for over 2,000 nights.

On 20 December 1875 Reeve opened the fine new Edinburgh Theatre on Castle Terrace, Edinburgh which he leased for two years. Productions there included grand operas with Her Majesty's Opera Company, and von Weber's Der Freischütz and other operas with the Carl Rosa Company, but was not a spectacular success, for which Reeve was blamed, and the theatre closed after eighteen months. The theatre, a venture of the Edinburgh Theatre, Winter Garden and Aquarium Company, was in 1876 sold for a fraction of its cost to the United Presbyterian Church for use as a Synod Hall, and later became a cinema.

== Australia ==
In October 1878 he was brought to Melbourne by George Coppin to play "Count Fosco" and over the next two years played the part before enthusiastic audiences in all the major theatres in Australia. Another favorite of theatre-goers was his "Captain Wragge" in Great Temptation, his dramatization of Wilkie Collins's No Name.

When Arthur Garner took over White's Rooms on King William Street in 1880 and remodelled it as "Garner's Theatre", he appointed Reeve as manager.

In May 1885 Wybert Reeve's company performed at Abbot's Opera House in Auckland, New Zealand. The productions included Impulse!, The Woman in White and For Love or Money! by Andrew Haidley.

In 1887 Reeve entered into partnership with Williamson, Garner & Musgrove as manager of the Theatre Royal, Adelaide, and around 1889 he became sole lessee of the theatre. On 19 October 1896 he hosted the first public moving picture demonstration in South Australia, a cinématographe Lumière. Reeve occupied that position till 1900, when he retired to be succeeded by F. H. Pollock. A complimentary benefit was tendered to him by the citizens of Adelaide before he left for England: the first part of the programme was devoted to Waterloo, or the Old Veteran, a one-act play by Arthur Conan Doyle, Reeve playing Gregory Brewster, the "Old Veteran" of the title, originally written for Henry Irving. In a gracious farewell speech, he recollected with pride the improvements which he had brought to the staging of plays in Adelaide, referring to the Theatre Royal as one of the most difficult theatres in Australia to manage. He gave as his opinion that the public should support second-tier pieces by up-and-coming companies as well as the "hit shows", as only then could theatre progress. He also expressed the hope that Adelaide and the State would flourish under what to him would be the wisest and greatest advance in the history of Australia — Federation of the Colonies.

He died at his home, "Walmer", Castle Road, Newport, Isle of Wight, and was buried nearby.

== Author, journalist and playwright ==
Reeve wrote an autobiography From Life, which contains reminiscences of his theatrical experiences, compiled from articles in The Australasian and other sources. He was a regular contributor to The Register on developments in English theatre. He wrote for the Victorian Review, He wrote an essay on Wilkie Collins for Chambers's Journal, the only biography of the novelist published in his lifetime. He also contributed an article entitled Sam Bough. R.S.A. in Chambers's Journal of October 30, 1902.

Apart from his early farces, An Australian Hoax and Supper Gratis mentioned above, Reeve was author of the comedies Only Dust, Never Count Your Chickens, Parted, The Better Angel, I Have You, Won at Last, Not So Bad After All, Pike O'Callaghan and Obliging a Friend and dramatized Mrs. Riddell's George Geith and, with the acquiescence of Wilkie Collins, Great Temptation, his adaptation of No Name. He adapted Rosa Praed's Policy and Passion for the stage, and as Passion was first performed in 1884.

== Other interests ==
Reeve not only played, but also studied Shakespeare, and it was his aim to bring about a greater appreciation of the works of "The Bard", and as manager of the Theatre Royal always aimed at the highest standards of production. He was involved with the Adelaide University Shakespeare Society in a number of ways, notably as a lecturer and critic. In a farewell speech, Sir Samuel Way said the society had been exceedingly fortunate in having had for so many years the services and advice of a man of such high culture, who had made a lifelong study of Shakespeare's works.

He was a popular lecturer on subjects dear to his heart, and frequently preached from the pulpit of the Unitarian Church on Wakefield Street, Adelaide.

Reeve was the first captain of the Corps of Commissionaires, a body of the citizens' militia in Adelaide, and as with the Theatre Royal, was succeeded by Pollock.
