= George Rignold =

English actor

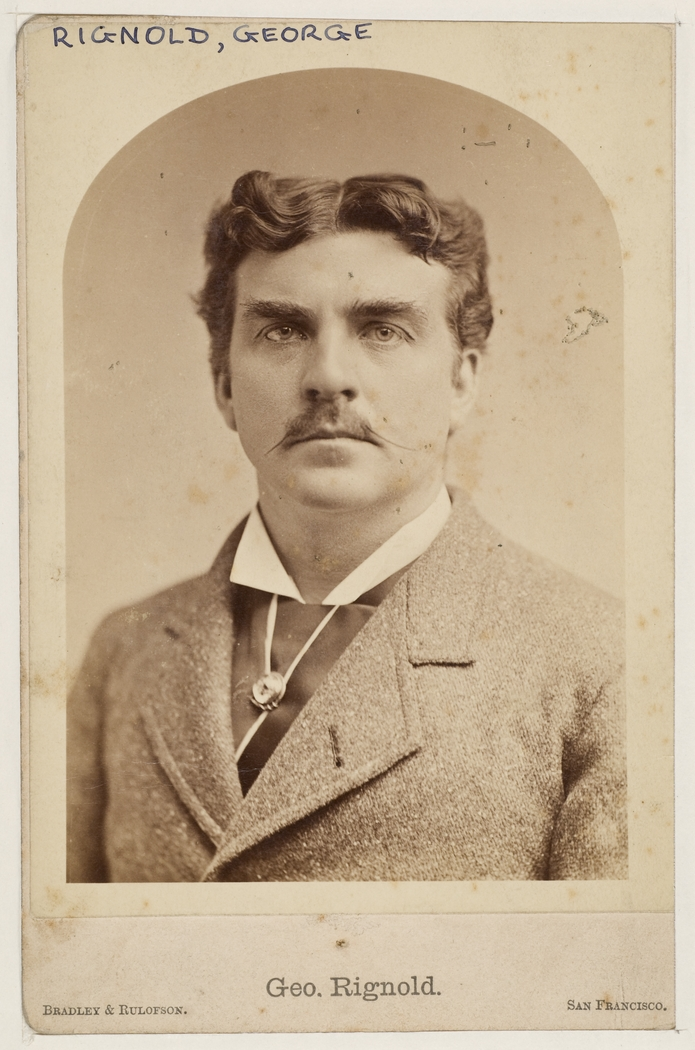
- George Rignold, actor, c.1887, carte de visite by Bradley and Rulofson. State Library of New South Wales
- Born: George Richard Rignall; 1839; Leicester, England
- Died: 16 December 1912 (aged 72–73); Sydney, Australia
- Known for: actor

George Richard Rignold, née Rignall, (1839 – 16 December 1912) was an English-born actor, active in Britain and Australia.

== Early life ==
Rignold was born in Birmingham, England. He was the son of William Rignall, an actor and theatre manager, and his wife Patience Blaxland, an actress. The surname Rignold was used professionally by both George and his brother William. George Rignold began his acting career quite young, playing the part of the messenger in Macbeth.

== Acting career ==
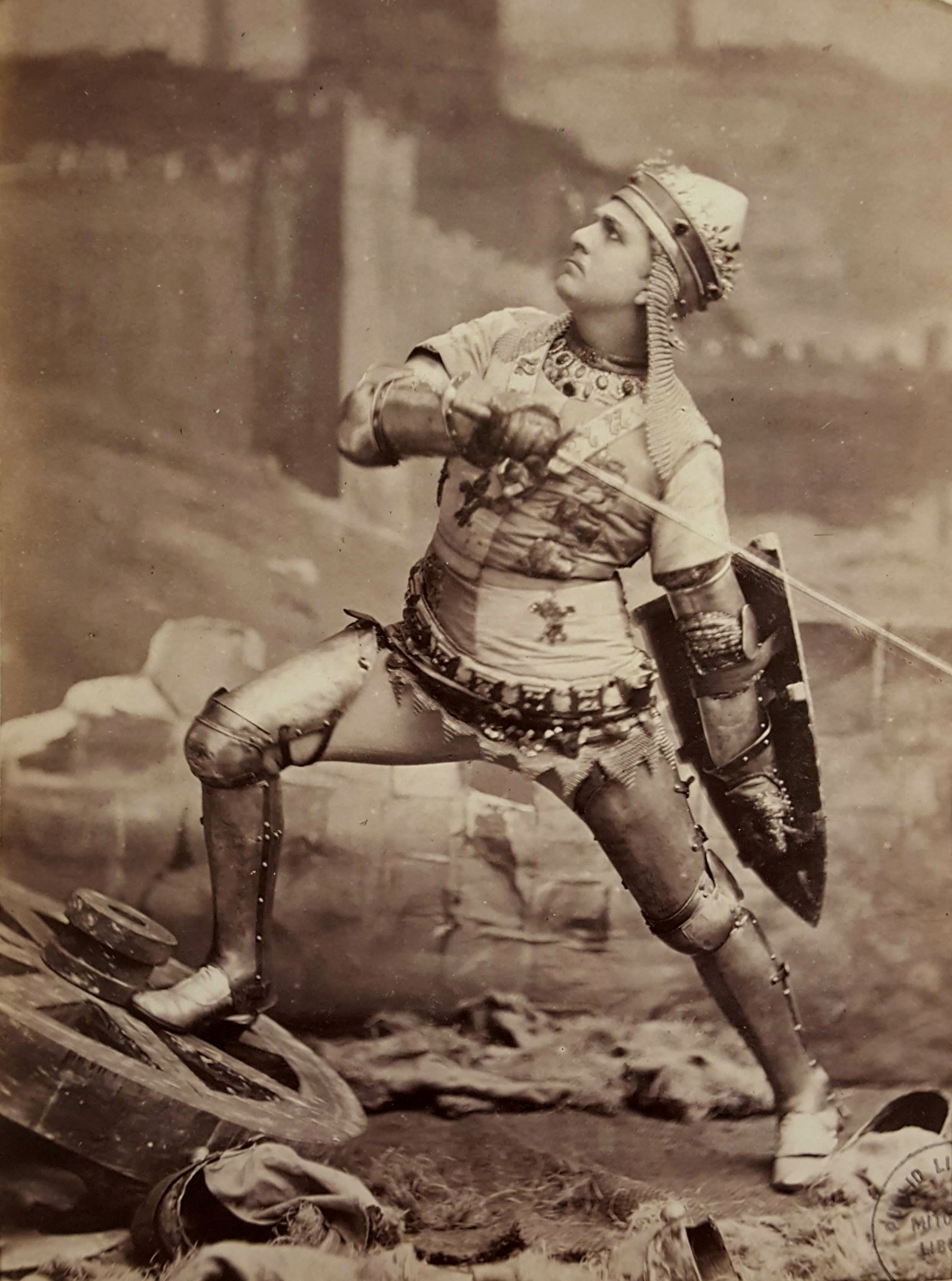
George Rignold as Henry the Fifth, 1877

Rignold soon gained a reputation in London as an actor, playing the parts of William in Black-Eyed Susan and Romeo in Romeo and Juliet. In 1869, he was part of the company at the Queen's Theatre, Long Acre. He then toured the United States (where women would fight over the good-looking actor) and Canada from 1875, where he made a great impression — a reference in The Atlantic Monthly in 1938 shows that memory of him persisted. He then toured in Australia. He spent a season playing Henry V at Drury Lane, where Staffordshire replicas were made of Rignold as the king on horseback.

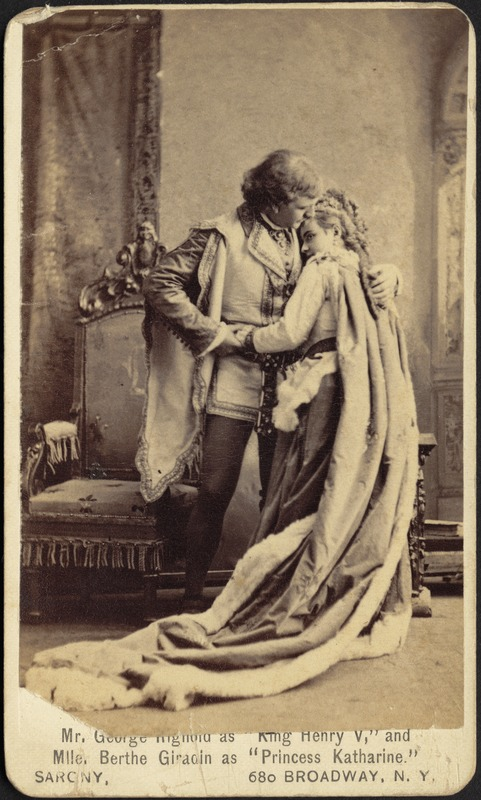
Mr. George Rignold as "King Henry V," and Mlle. Berthe Giradin as "Princess Katharine.", [ca. 1859–1870]. Carte de Visite Collection, Boston Public Library

On May 30, 1877, at Booth's Theatre, he played Romeo to seven different actresses playing Juliet, including Adelaide Neilson, Fanny Davenport, Ada Dyas and Marie Wainwright.

He then had a considerable career in Australia as a theatrical impresario and manager, often in conjunction with James Allison and F. H. Pollock.

Rignold again toured the United States and then settled in Australia. He held the lease for Her Majesty's Theatre, Sydney when it opened 10 September 1887 and held it for seven years. Rignold played Henry V on opening night.

The Bulletin of 18 November 1899 criticised his arrogance and impatience with stage-managers. He retired in 1900 but came out of retirement in 1907 to play Jason successfully in The Bondman, produced by Bland Holt. His last stage appearance was at a benefit for George Sutton Titheradge in December 1910.

== Late life ==
Rignold's first wife, Marie Brabrook Henderson, played opposite her husband in many roles. She died 25 February 1902. He remarried in 1907 Georgina Coppin, a daughter of Australian actor and entrepreneur George Selth Coppin. There were no children by either marriage. Rignold died on 16 December 1912 at Charlemont Private Hospital, Darlinghurst. He left his estate of £11,000 to the Royal General Theatrical Fund.

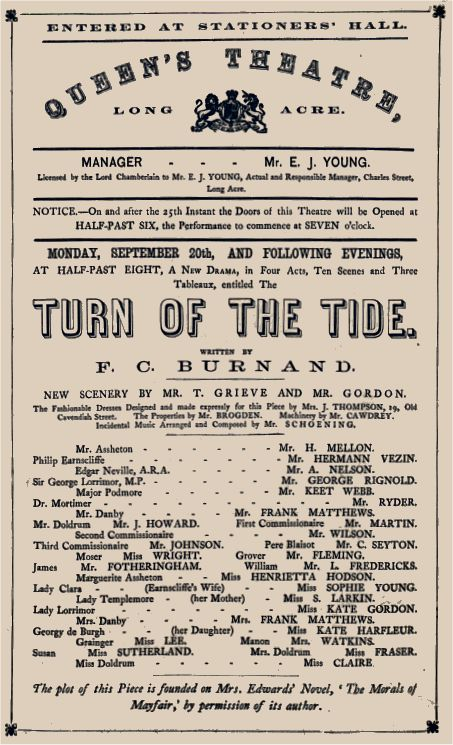
1869 programme featuring Rignold
