= Elizabeth Nickell-Lean =

English opera singer and actor

Elizabeth Nickell-Lean in the title role in Iolanthe (1934)

Elizabeth Gertrude Nickell-Lean (11 May 1908–20 January 1986) was a mezzo-soprano who sang mostly minor roles with the D'Oyly Carte Opera Company for six years during the 1930s and on occasion sang the main soubrette roles, including the title character in Iolanthe.

== Early life and career ==
Nickell-Lean was born in Liverpool in 1908, one of four children of Philippa Marian née West (1878–1935) and Thomas Nickell-Lean (1869–1923). Her older sister Marion Marjorie Nickell-Lean (1903–1970) married Sir William Prince-Smith O.B.E. M.C. (1898–1964) 3rd baronet of the Prince-Smith baronets of Hillbrook. Nickell-Lean first appeared on stage in 1915, aged seven, in a Liverpool charity performance. Following this she was reportedly offered a place with the Liverpool Repertory Theatre, which was declined by her parents. She went on to study singing and German lieder in Manchester and London and made a number of concert appearances across the provinces.

== D'Oyly Carte years ==
She joined the chorus of the D'Oyly Carte Opera Company in November 1931 and was soon playing minor roles including Isabel in The Pirates of Penzance, Peep-Bo in The Mikado, Ruth in Ruddigore and Giulia in The Gondoliers. By August 1932 she moved up to the slightly larger role of Vittoria in The Gondoliers so that during the 1932–34 seasons she regularly sang Isabel, Peep-Bo, Ruth and Vittoria. During the temporary absence of the company's leading mezzo-soprano, Marjorie Eyre, Nickell-Lean stepped in to play the leading soubrette roles of Iolanthe in Iolanthe, Melissa in Princess Ida, Pitti-Sing in The Mikado, Mad Margaret in Ruddigore and Phoebe Meryll in The Yeomen of the Guard.

In August 1934 Nickell-Lean was promoted to the title role in Iolanthe, and for a period added the small role of Ada in Princess Ida while continuing to play her other minor roles. She appeared in these roles in the 1934 North America tour. During the 1935–36 season she relinquished Iolanthe to Eyre and assumed the small role of Leila in that operetta, adding more small roles to her repertoire: Lady Saphir in Patience, Kate in Pirates and Sacharissa in Princess Ida. Meanwhile, she continued to play Peep-Bo in The Mikado, Ruth in Ruddigore and Vittoria in The Gondoliers, while continuing to fill in as required in the principal mezzo-soprano roles.

In August 1936 Nickell-Lean again played the title role in Iolanthe, and during 1936–37, her last season with D'Oyly Carte, she joined the company's 1936 tour of North America, appearing as Kate in Pirates, Lady Saphir in Patience, the title role in Iolanthe, Sacharissa in Princess Ida, Peep-Bo in The Mikado, and Vittoria in The Gondoliers. She sang Peep-Bo on the D'Oyly Carte's 1936 recording of The Mikado. Nickell-Lean left the D'Oyly Carte Opera Company in July 1937 but credited as Elizabeth Paynter she played Pitti-Sing in the 1939 film The Mikado.

== Retirement and last years ==
Nickell-Lean retired from the stage in 1939 in London when she married clinical pathologist Dr. Hugh Francis Brewer (1901–1982) of the Ministry of Health Emergency Hospital Service. Later that year the two were registered as living in Luton, Bedfordshire, where Nickell-Lean's occupation was listed as "Unpaid domestic duties".

During the D'Oyly Carte Opera Company's centenary celebrations in 1975 all 13 extant Gilbert and Sullivan operas were performed. In the final performance of Trial by Jury the regular D'Oyly Carte chorus was augmented by fourteen former stars of the company: Sylvia Cecil, Elsie Griffin, Ivan Menzies, John Dean, Radley Flynn, Nickell-Lean, Ella Halman, Leonard Osborn, Cynthia Morey, Jeffrey Skitch, Alan Barrett, Mary Sansom, Philip Potter and Gillian Humphreys.

In her later years Nickell-Lean lived at 9 Barton Street in London, SW1. She died in 1986, aged 77, and left an estate valued at £462,519.
