= Charles Goulding =

British singer and actor

Charles Eric Goulding (c.1887 – 9 November 1939) was a British operatic tenor and actor best known for his performances with the D'Oyly Carte Opera Company in the Gilbert and Sullivan repertory.

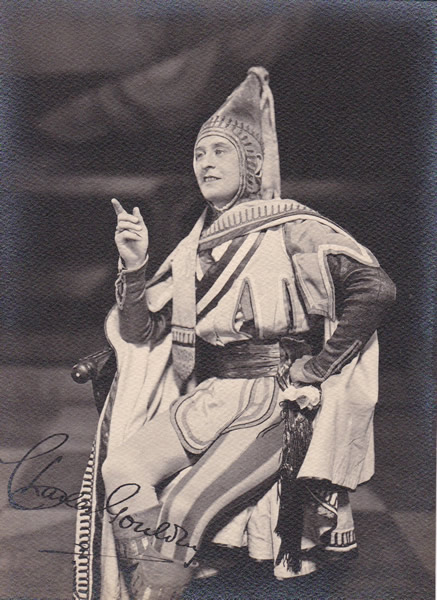
Goulding as Hilarion in Princess Ida

After training as a choirboy, considerable youthful performing and distinguished service in the Army, Goulding joined D'Oyly Carte in 1919, with whom he would spend nearly all of his professional career. He sang 14 different principal roles with the company between 1919 and 1936, including all of the leading tenor roles in the company's 11 Gilbert and Sullivan productions, plus Cyril in Princess Ida, Strephon in Iolanthe and Mr. Box in Cox and Box. Despite his long service with the company, he was disappointed, whenever the more famous tenor Derek Oldham appeared with the company, to be given second choices of the tenor roles or to be omitted altogether, in the case of two American tours. Oldham also played the tenor roles in most of the recordings made by the company during Goulding's tenure.

== Life and career ==
=== Early years ===
Goulding was born in Ireland and became an orphan as an infant. He was brought up by relatives in Bristol, England, where he sang as a choirboy at St. Mary Redcliffe beginning at the age of eight. He then sang at Colston Hall with Charles Santley and Dame Clara Butt at one of the Triennial Leeds Festivals. After this, he performed with the Royal Orpheus Glee Club and the Bristol Amateur Operatic Society. Goulding served with distinction in the army during the World War I and was wounded several times.

In 1919, Goulding was engaged by the D'Oyly Carte Opera Company on tour, first performing in the chorus, but soon playing principal tenor roles in the Savoy operas. His first roles, in the summer of that year, were Nanki-Poo in The Mikado, Colonel Fairfax in The Yeomen of the Guard, and Marco in The Gondoliers. He became the main tenor in another D'Oyly Carte touring company and played Nanki-Poo, Fairfax, Marco and Earl Tolloller in Iolanthe, switching the next season to the romantic baritone role of Strephon in Iolanthe instead of Tolloller. In 1921, he added to his repertoire the role of Frederic in The Pirates of Penzance and continued to play these roles for the next two years.

Goulding rejoined the main company in 1923, both on tour and in the company's London seasons, playing and sometimes sharing with another tenor, the roles of Alexis in The Sorcerer, Frederic, Tolloller, Prince Hilarion in Princess Ida, Fairfax, Marco, Mr. Box in Cox and Box and Richard Dauntless in Ruddigore. The next season, he played the role of the Duke of Dunstable in Patience for the first time, and in the 1925–26 season, he added the role of Ralph Rackstraw in H.M.S. Pinafore to his list of characters sharing some of these roles from time to time. In 1926 he first played the Defendant in Trial by Jury. The Times said that Goulding's was an "honest tenor".

=== Later years ===
Goulding continued to play most of these tenor roles and Mr. Box until the autumn of 1929, when Derek Oldham returned to the company to sing Ralph, Frederic, Nanki-Poo, Fairfax, Marco and Hilarion for several months. At that time, Goulding took over the role of Cyril in Princess Ida and shared Tolloller with Oldham, while continuing with the other five characters. He then resumed with all of the Gilbert and Sullivan tenor characters over the next few seasons until 1934. The D'Oyly Carte Opera Company travelled to New York City in the autumn of 1934, but Martin Beck, the manager of the eponymous theatre, insisted that the more famous Oldham play the tenor roles.

Goulding rejoined the Company in February 1935, replacing Oldham for the rest of the North American tour, playing nearly all the tenor roles. Returning to England, Goulding split the tenor roles in 1935–36, generally with John Dean. The company scheduled another US tour for the following season with Oldham, and, disappointed, Goulding left the company.

Afterwards, Goulding sang in a number of Gilbert and Sullivan concerts, and he taught singing, as well as directing Gilbert and Sullivan for amateur companies. Goulding often attended functions of the Gilbert and Sullivan Society and was an avid golfer. He was also a member of the St. Augustine Lodge of Freemasons.

Goulding died at the age of 52, only three years after leaving the D'Oyly Carte Opera Company.

== Recordings ==
During Goulding's tenure after rejoining the main D'Oyly Carte Opera Company in 1923, the company recorded 16 albums with His Master's Voice, but the tenor roles in most of these went to Oldham. Goulding appears only in the recordings of H.M.S. Pinafore (1930 – Ralph) and Princess Ida (1932 – Cyril; Oldham sang Hilarion). Goulding sang with D'Oyly Carte for BBC radio as Nanki-Poo in The Mikado (broadcast in 1926), Mr. Box in Cox & Box (1929), excerpts of The Mikado (as Nanki Poo) in 1932 and 1933, The Gondoliers (as Marco) in 1932 and Yeomen (as Fairfax) in 1932 and 1935, with the D'Oyly Carte. Goulding also played Nanki-Poo in a four-minute silent promotional film made of the D'Oyly Carte Mikado in 1926.
