= Meston Reid =

British opera singer and actor (1945–1993)

Meston Reid as Captain Fitzbattleaxe in Utopia, Limited, 1975

Alexander Meston Reid (21 March 1945 – 31 October 1993), better known as Meston Reid, was a Scottish opera singer and actor, best known for his performances in tenor roles of the Savoy Operas with the D'Oyly Carte Opera Company. After working his way up through the ranks for four years with Sadler's Wells Opera and on tour, Reid joined D'Oyly Carte as one of the company's principal tenors, where he eventually played most of the leading tenor roles in the Gilbert and Sullivan operas until the company closed in 1982. He continued to sing and direct until his sudden death in 1993.

== Early life ==
Reid was born in Strathdee, Aberdeenshire, Scotland. He began his musical career as a boy soprano, making his first public appearance aged 6. He attended the Aboyne Academy, which he left aged 15 to work on his father's farm, singing in concerts in his spare time. At the age of eighteen, he joined the Lyric Musical Society of Aberdeen, sang with the Inverness Opera Company, and began to take singing and piano lessons. He was a finalist in the Count Cinzano Scholarship competition for young singers in 1965. Intending to pursue a career in music, Reid left the family farm and moved to Aberdeen where he worked for a food firm while continuing to study music.

== Career ==
He made his professional debut in a Scottish variety show at the Tivoli Theatre in Aberdeen and performed with Sadler's Wells Opera for four years, first in the chorus before graduating to small parts. His first solo role was Lun Tha in The King and I in 1972. In 1973 he appeared in The Leslie Crowther Show and toured in Lilac Time and as Sid-el-Karr in The Desert Song.

Reid joined the D'Oyly Carte Opera Company in 1974, playing the part of Earl Tolloller in Iolanthe. He soon added the roles of Mr. Box in Cox and Box, Alexis Poindextre in The Sorcerer, Ralph in H.M.S. Pinafore, the Duke of Dunstable in Patience, Richard in Ruddigore, and Marco Palmieri in The Gondoliers. When the company revived Utopia Limited for its 1975 Centenary season, Reid played the role of Captain Fitzbattleaxe. That year, Reid added to his repertoire the parts of Frederic in The Pirates of Penzance and Leonard Meryll in The Yeomen of the Guard. In the 1977 revival of Princess Ida, he assumed the role of Prince Hilarion. He played Ralph in the Royal Command Performance of Pinafore at Windsor Castle to celebrate Queen Elizabeth's Silver Jubilee. He continued to play principal tenor roles with the company until it closed in 1982.

Reid later appeared in the chorus of The Metropolitan Mikado in 1985 and sang with the Scottish Chamber Orchestra and in the show Grand Tour of Melody with Richard Baker. From 1989, he went on concert tours of Scotland, and in 1993 he joined the concert group "The Stars of Operetta". In 1987, he was first engaged as the director of the Godalming Operatic Society, an amateur society with a long association with ex-D'Oyly Carte directors. He directed their productions until 1993.

Reid's roles recorded with D'Oyly Carte included Fitzbattleaxe in Utopia (1976), Ernest Dummkopf in The Grand Duke (1976), Marco in The Gondoliers (1977), Aesculapius Carboy in The Zoo (1978), and Leonard Meryll in Yeomen (1979). He also participated in the D'Oyly Carte: The Last Night recording in 1982. In 1989 he made a recording of traditional Scottish songs.

== Death ==
Reid died suddenly in 1993 at the age of 48.
