= Alan Styler =

British opera singer

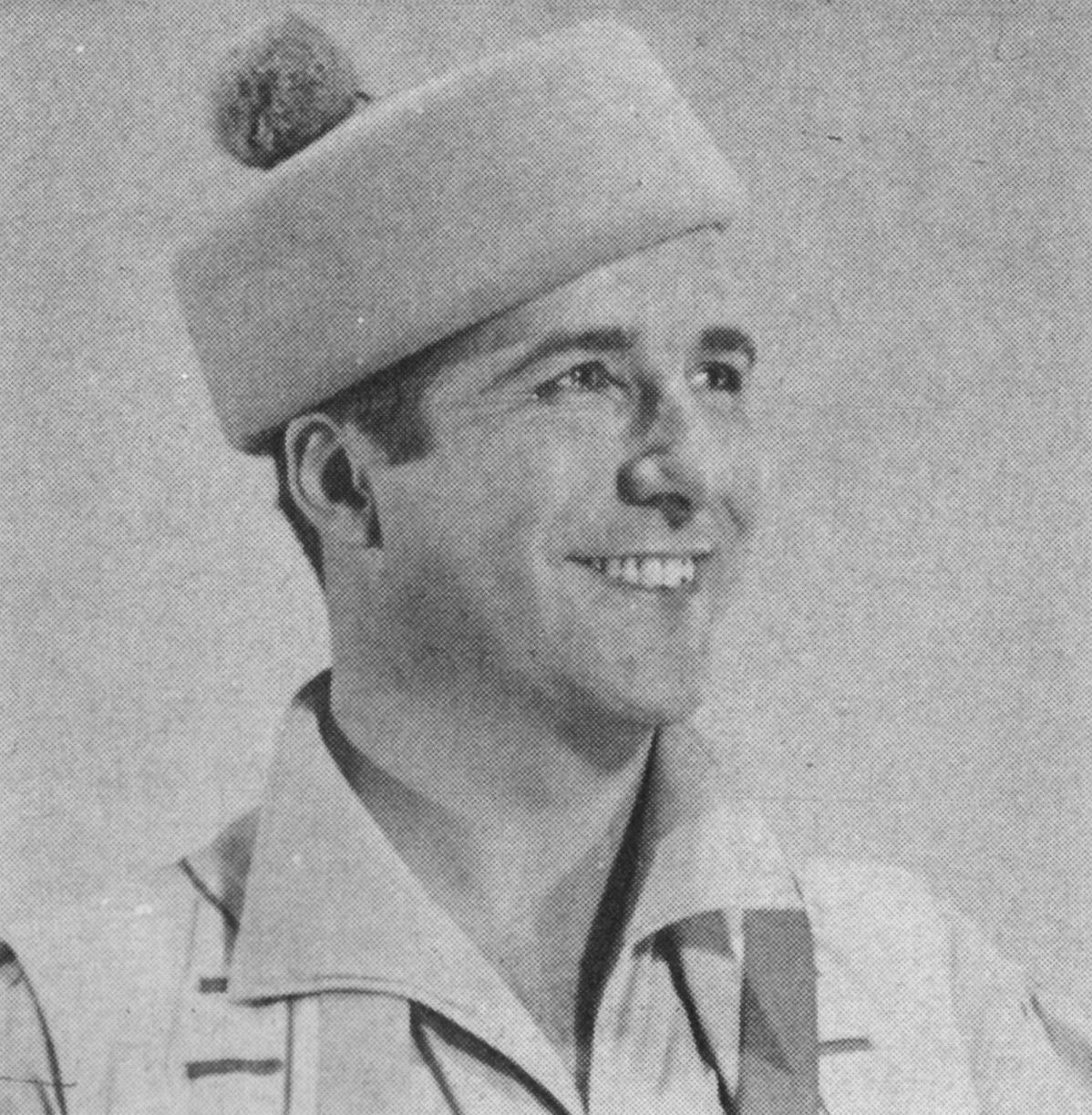
Alan Styler, circa 1962

Alan Arthur Styler (1 October 1925 – 1 September 1970) was an English opera singer, best known for his performances in baritone roles of the Savoy Operas with the D'Oyly Carte Opera Company.

After service in the Grenadier Guards during the Second World War, Styler joined D'Oyly Carte in 1947, where he spent his entire two-decade career. Some of his key roles were the Counsel in Trial by Jury, Strephon in Iolanthe, Pish-Tush in The Mikado, Giuseppe in The Gondoliers, Mr. Cox in Cox and Box, Grosvenor in Patience and the Lieutenant of the Tower in The Yeomen of the Guard. He recorded most of these roles with the company. Styler was particularly popular with both audiences and his fellow members of D'Oyly Carte. He married fellow D'Oyly Carte player Vera Ryan.

== Early life and career ==
Styler was born in Redditch, Worcestershire, the son of Arthur Styler and Madeleine née Cook. He had a sister, Iris M. Styler (born 1919), and a brother, John Harold S. Styler (1923–1994). Alan Styler studied singing as a teenager and joined the Grenadier Guards at the age of seventeen. After leaving the service in 1946, he pursued his aspirations to become a professional singer. He joined the D'Oyly Carte Opera Company chorus in 1947 and soon was assigned his first role, Antonio in The Gondoliers.

In 1948, Styler was also given the small role of Second Yeoman in The Yeomen of the Guard and was made an understudy for the "juvenile" Gilbert and Sullivan baritone roles. He began, in 1949, to fill in frequently as the Counsel in Trial by Jury (otherwise as the Associate), Strephon in Iolanthe, Pish-Tush in The Mikado, and Giuseppe in The Gondoliers and also to regularly play the roles of Mr. Cox in Cox and Box, and Grosvenor in Patience. He continued to perform all these roles through October 1952, when he took a three-month leave because of illness. In 1953, Styler yielded the roles of Pish-Tush and Grosvenor, but added the role of the Lieutenant of the Tower, in Yeomen.

== Later years ==
From 1953 through 1962, Styler regularly played Cox, the Counsel, Strephon, the Lieutenant, and Giuseppe. During several seasons, he also appeared as Pish-Tush and added the roles of Captain Corcoran in H.M.S. Pinafore and Florian in Princess Ida in 1957, and Samuel in The Pirates of Penzance in 1962. In the winter of 1962–1963, Styler fell ill again and left the company for several months. He returned in 1963, playing or sharing his old roles and, for several seasons, the Earl of Mountararat instead of Strephon in Iolanthe. After a lung operation in 1968, his doctor advised him to give up performing.

Styler married fellow D'Oyly Carte (and later Gilbert and Sullivan for All) player Veronica Cross (stage name Vera Ryan) in Manchester in 1960. The couple had three daughters. In his spare time, Styler enjoyed fishing and golf.

Styler died in Manchester, England at the age of 44. He was popular with both audiences and his fellow members of D'Oyly Carte. Members of the D'Oyly Carte Opera Company and the touring company Gilbert and Sullivan for All joined together to pay tribute to Styler in a memorial service at St. Paul's Church, Covent Garden.

== Recordings ==
Styler's roles recorded with D'Oyly Carte included Pish-Tush (1950, 1958), Giuseppe (1950, 1961), Strephon (1952, 1960), Grosvenor (1952), Cox (1961), and a role he never played on stage with the company, Doctor Daly in The Sorcerer (1966). Of his first recording as Giuseppe, reviewer Raymond Walker wrote that he "has a voice of [...] rounded tone, good diction, never sounds forced and generally captivates interest. Styler's rendering of 'Rising Early in the Morning' is everything it should be."
