= Pamela Field =

Welsh operatic soprano

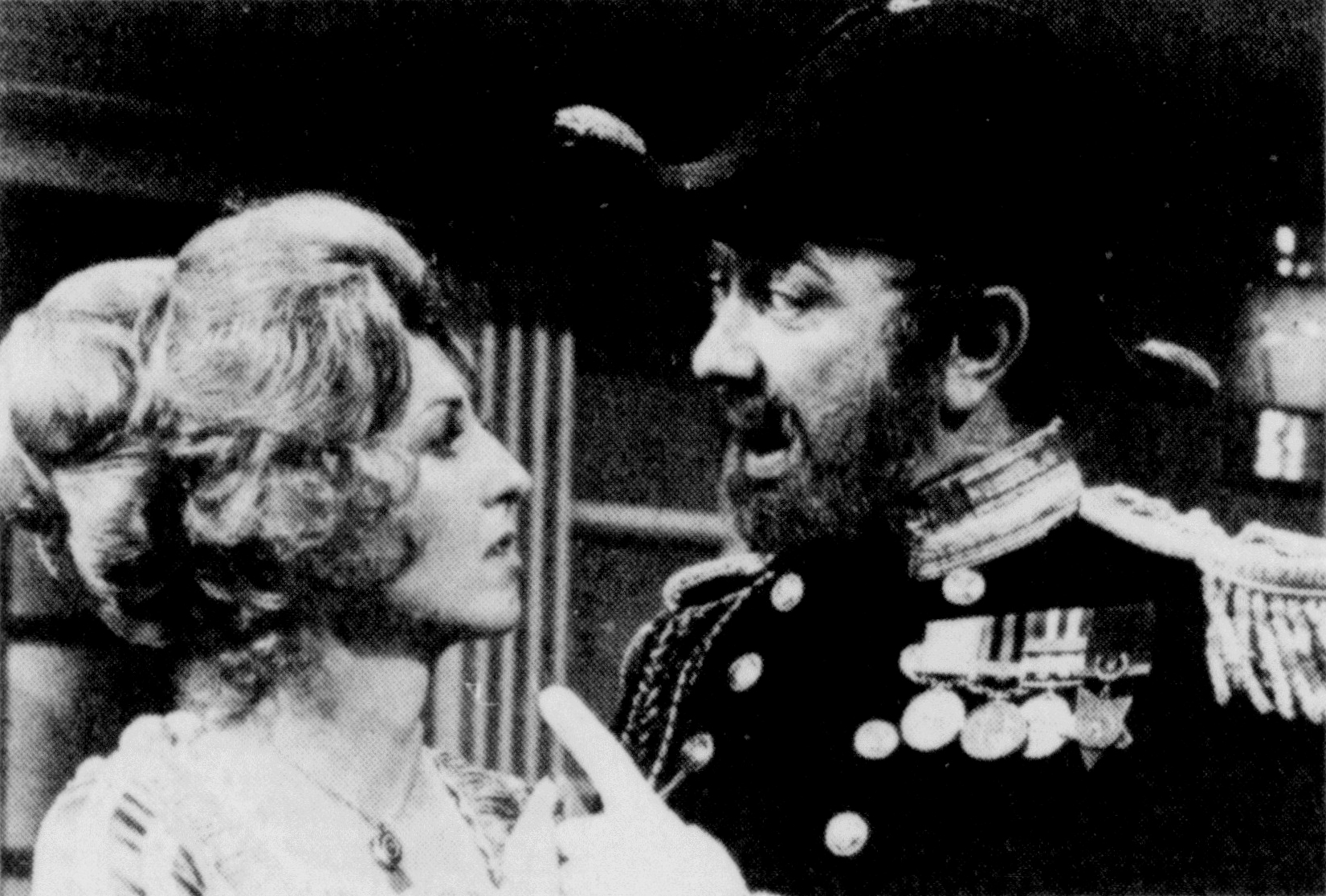
Field as Josephine in H.M.S. Pinafore with Michael Rayner as Captain Corcoran

Pamela Field is a Welsh operatic soprano best known for her performances in principal soprano roles with the D'Oyly Carte Opera Company in the 1970s and 1980s, including as Josephine in H.M.S. Pinafore, Phyllis in Iolanthe, Gianetta in The Gondoliers, Elsie Maynard in The Yeomen of the Guard and the titular character in Patience.

== Biography ==
Field was born in Aberdare in South Wales. She studied at the Welsh College of Music and Drama and Royal College of Music and won the Young Welsh Singers Competition and Pernod Award before joining the D'Oyly Carte Opera Company in September 1972. She originally sang in the chorus and minor soprano roles, including Lady Ella in Patience, Celia in Iolanthe and Fiametta in The Gondoliers, as well as serving as an understudy for the principal soprano roles.

At the beginning of the 1973–74 season, Field assumed a number of the principal soprano roles, including Josephine in H.M.S. Pinafore, the titular character in Patience, Phyllis in Iolanthe, Elsie Maynard in The Yeomen of the Guard and Gianetta in The Gondoliers. She played Princess Zara in D'Oyly Carte's 1975 production of Utopia, Limited and the Princess of Monte Carlo in a concert performance of The Grand Duke before leaving the company in August 1975.

Field later returned to D'Oyly Carte as a guest artist, as Elsie in The Yeomen of the Guard in 1975 and as Phyllis in Iolanthe, Josephine in H.M.S. Pinafore and Aline in The Sorcerer during the company's final season in 1981–82.

Field is married to David Porter, a bass-baritone who also performed with D'Oyly Carte. She resides in South Wales, where she is now a voice teacher.

== Recordings ==
Field sang the role of Phyllis on the 1974 D'Oyly Carte recording of Iolanthe and as Princess Zara on the 1976 recording of Utopia, Limited, on which her husband David Porter also appears as Mr Blushington. On video, Field performed the role of Josephine in the 1973 D'Oyly Carte telefilm of H.M.S. Pinafore and as Leila in Brent Walker's 1982 video of Iolanthe.
