= Patricia Leonard =

English opera singer (1936–2010)

Pat Leonard as Little Buttercup, 1979

Patricia Leonard (9 March 1936 – 28 January 2010) was an English opera singer, best known for her performances in mezzo-soprano and contralto roles of the Savoy Operas with the D'Oyly Carte Opera Company.

After working as a secretary, Leonard turned to singing in concerts and on the radio. She began to sing opera, first with Sadler's Wells Opera, and joined the D'Oyly Carte in 1972. There she moved up from chorister to small-role player, understudying larger roles, taking on the major mezzo-soprano role of Mad Margaret in Ruddigore in 1975. In 1977, she took over as the company's principal contralto, playing ten of these leading roles with the company until its closure in 1982. She married Michael Buchan (né Michael Fox), who joined D'Oyly Carte with her and performed frequently with her in later years.

In later years, she continued to perform in Gilbert and Sullivan operas with various opera companies and with the group Gilbert and Sullivan for All. She also returned to singing in concerts, including oratorios, opera pieces and other classical works, including in a series of The Proms evenings with the National Concert Orchestra, as well as operetta, musical theatre and music hall. She appeared on BBC broadcasts and in plays, films and commercials until about 2008 and gave singing lessons.

== Life and career ==
Patricia Leonard was born in Stoke-on-Trent and brought up in Stourbridge, Worcester, England. She studied the piano and took voice lessons from the bass-baritone John Dethick in Sheffield. While working as a secretary, she began to perform with an amateur operatic society, where she met bass-baritone Michael Fox (who later used the stage name Michael Buchan), whom she would later marry. Becoming more serious about performing, she began to study voice at the Birmingham School of Music. Among other awards, she won the Rose Bowl at the Blackpool Music Festival at the age of twenty.

Leonard began her career a soloist in oratorio and a recitalist for BBC Radio. She also performed with the Midland Music Makers Grand Opera Society, in such roles as Conchakovna in Prince Igor. She then sang with Sadler's Wells Opera for two years as a chorister and in concerts and oratorios after which she and her husband joined D'Oyly Carte in 1972.

=== D'Oyly Carte years ===
She soon was chosen as a regular standby for the role of Edith in The Pirates of Penzance. In 1973 she was given the roles of Leila in Iolanthe, Peep-Bo in The Mikado, Vittoria in The Gondoliers, Cousin Hebe in H.M.S. Pinafore, Edith and Lady Saphir in Patience. She also performed as the understudy for Mrs. Partlett in The Sorcerer and Tessa in The Gondoliers. In 1975 she added Elsa in The Grand Duke to her repertory when the D'Oyly Carte revived that work in concert during its Centenary season, and Mad Margaret in Ruddigore. The Times called her portrayal of Margaret "variously poignant or histrionic ... yet infused with a sensual quality". She also began to understudy the title role in Iolanthe and Phoebe Meryll in The Yeomen of the Guard.

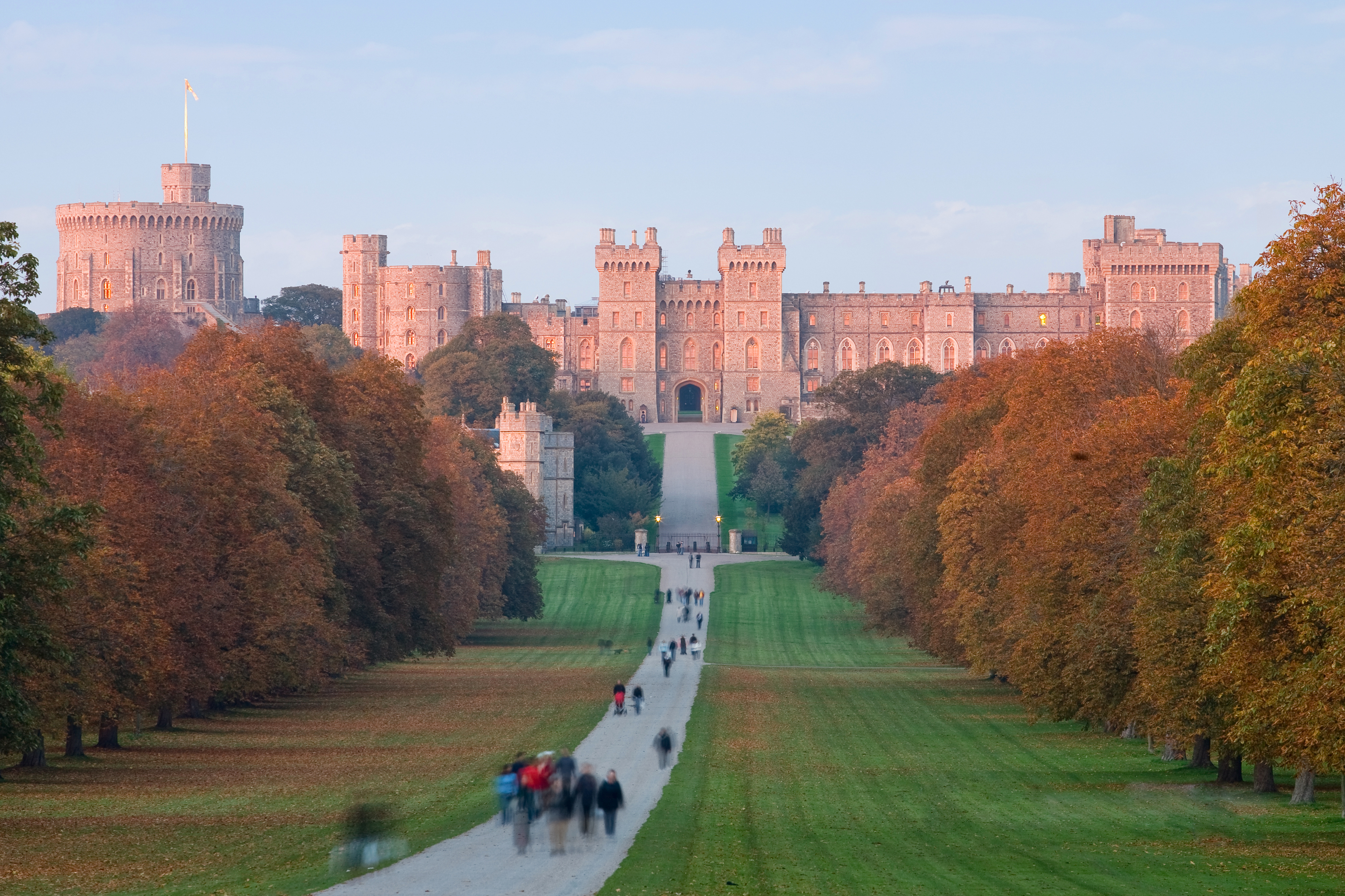
Leonard performed at a Royal Command Performance at Windsor Castle in 1977

In 1977, Leonard played the role of Hebe in the Royal Command Performance of Pinafore at Windsor Castle to celebrate Queen Elizabeth's Silver Jubilee (Leonard's husband played the Carpenter's Mate). That year, she was promoted to principal contralto of the D'Oyly Carte Opera Company, and from 1977 until the company closed in 1982, she played the roles of Lady Sangazure in The Sorcerer, Little Buttercup in Pinafore, Ruth in The Pirates of Penzance, Lady Jane in Patience, the Fairy Queen in Iolanthe, Lady Blanche in Princess Ida, Katisha in The Mikado, Dame Hannah in Ruddigore, Dame Carruthers in Yeomen, and the Duchess of Plaza-Toro in The Gondoliers.

The Times wrote that, in the contralto roles, Leonard eschewed "the more bizarre traits of these intimidating females in favour of a more balanced personification. As the domineering harridan Katisha [in The Mikado,] she convincingly demonstrated that the grotesque mask hid a fragile suffering woman. ... Her Queen of the Fairies [in Iolanthe,] outwardly so full of composure, betrayed in tantalising moments the character's repressed sensuality." Long-time musical director David Steadman wrote of her portrayals, "we felt the despair of Ruth losing Frederic's attentions in Pirates, we could easily believe that her Buttercup adored Captain Corcoran in the moonlit stillness of Act Two of H.M.S. Pinafore, that Katisha was a woman with feelings ... and that the Fairy Queen was a monarch with a matronly love for her girls."

=== Later years ===
After the closure of D'Oyly Carte, Leonard continued to perform in Gilbert and Sullivan operas, including as the Duchess in The Gondoliers, Katisha in The Mikado with New Sadler's Wells Opera, with Phoenix Opera at Gawsworth Hall for seven seasons in the principal contralto roles, and Katisha, Buttercup and Ruth in Norway. She also sang with Gilbert and Sullivan for All.

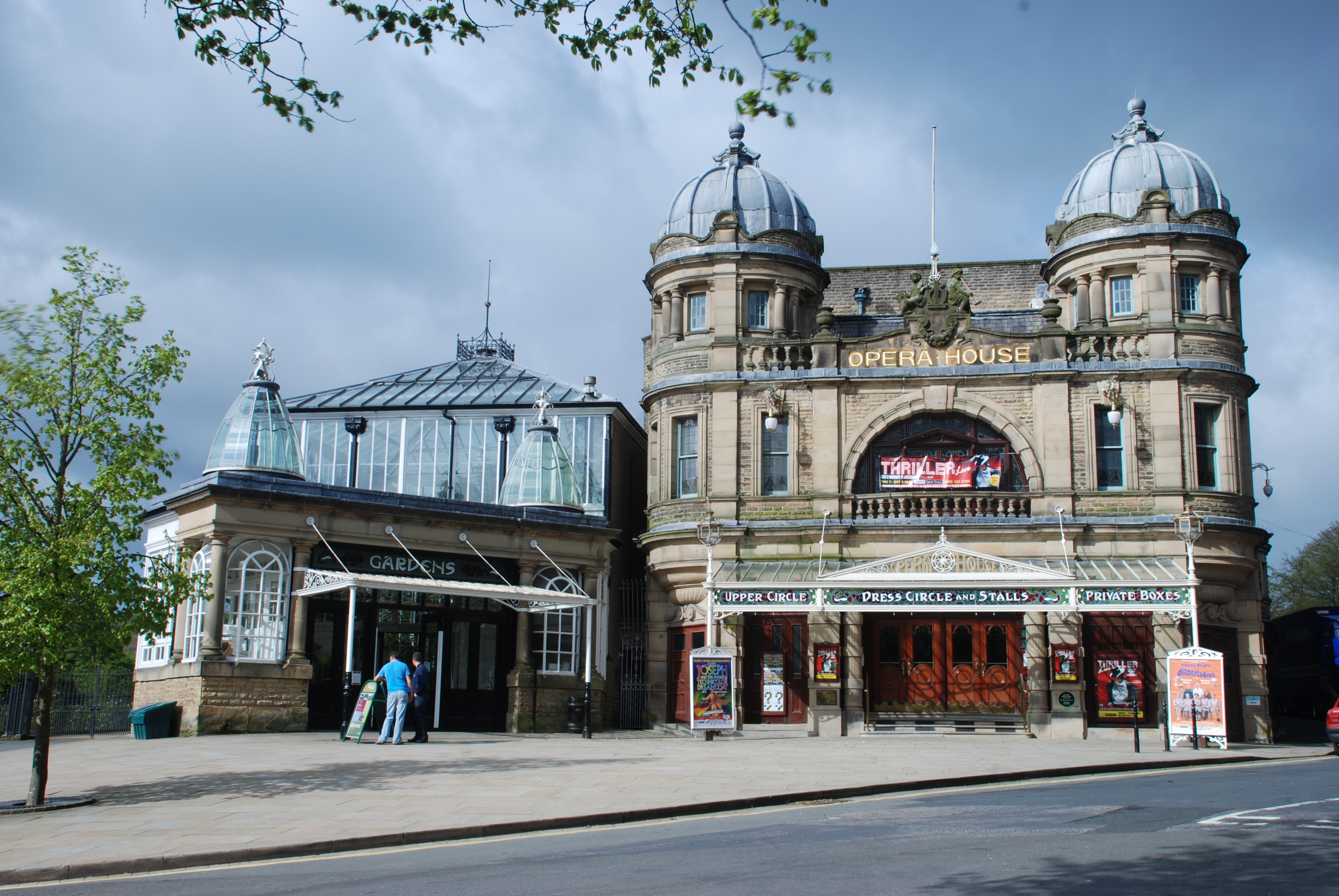
Buxton Opera House, where Leonard appeared at the International Gilbert and Sullivan Festival in later years

Leonard returned to singing in concerts and oratorios, at venues such as Royal Albert Hall, Royal Festival Hall, the Barbican Arts Centre, Symphony Hall, Birmingham, and St. David's Hall in Cardiff, Wales. Her concert performances included Gilbert and Sullivan, Ivor Novello, Five Sing Broadway, "Mr. Gilbert and Mr. Sullivan" (with Richard Baker), "Here's Yet Another How De Do" with David Steadman, and a series of The Proms evenings with the National Concert Orchestra. She also sang in concerts of opera, operetta and music hall on world cruises for Cunard.

Leonard appeared frequently with the Carl Rosa Opera Company and with "Much Loved Productions" in concerts of Gilbert and Sullivan and Rodgers and Hammerstein. She appeared on BBC broadcasts and in plays, films and commercials until about 2008 and gave singing lessons. Leonard and her husband toured in Britain, America, Australia and New Zealand, including in the 2005–2006 Carl Rosa tour of North America. They also participated in several productions and events at the International Gilbert and Sullivan Festival. Reviewing her performance as Katisha in 2005 for The British Theatre Guide, Peter Lathan wrote, "She was great: hard (indeed scary) exterior but with a softness underneath which was quite appealing." Leonard enjoyed interpreting Stephen Sondheim's songs, making "Losing My Mind" a speciality.

== Personal life and death ==
She was a vice-president of the Gilbert and Sullivan Society. Leonard and her husband had a son Andrew, and she had a stepdaughter Katie and one granddaughter, Shannon. They lived, in later years, in Clunton, Shropshire. They also owned various hostelries for a time. Leonard and Buchan enjoyed playing golf.

Leonard died of throat cancer in 2010, aged 73, at the Severn Hospice, Bicton Heath, Shrewsbury. Her ashes rest at the Emstrey Crematorium in Shrewsbury.

== Recordings ==
Her recordings with D'Oyly Carte included Leila in Iolanthe (1973), Elsa in The Grand Duke (1976), and Dame Carruthers in Yeomen (1979), and she is a soloist on the company's "Last Night" recording (1982). She appeared in the D'Oyly Carte film of H.M.S. Pinafore (1973), made at ATV Elstree Studios, and in the concert video "Gilbert & Sullivan's Greatest Hits" (1982), made at the Royal Albert Hall.
