= James Conroy-Ward =

British actor and singer

James Conroy-Ward (born 12 April 1947) is a retired English actor, singer and music publisher best known for performing the Gilbert and Sullivan principal comic roles with the D'Oyly Carte Opera Company.

== Biography ==
Conroy-Ward was born at Timperley in Cheshire. His grandparents had been entertainers, and Conroy-Ward was exposed to the theatre early on. As a child, he performed puppet shows at children's parties. He was head choirboy at his local church and attended the all-boys Altrincham Grammar School, where he performed female roles in Gilbert and Sullivan operas and won the Drama Prize. At the age of 12, Conroy-Ward was able to join the D'Oyly Carte Opera Company in Manchester playing the juvenile roles of the Midshipmite in H.M.S. Pinafore and Ko-Ko's assistant in The Mikado. He studied at the Royal Northern College of Music, winning the Imperial League of Opera Prize. He then gained experience on stage at the Palace Theatre in Manchester, in amateur productions, and at York Repertory, Granada TV, and The London Opera Centre. In 1968, he was engaged by the Royal Opera House in Covent Garden, where he sang for four and a half years in the chorus and in small principal roles.

In 1973, Conroy-Ward joined the D'Oyly Carte Opera Company in the chorus and also understudied John Reed in the principal comedian roles. As was customary in that company, the understudy was also given the small principal roles of Major Murgatroyd in Patience, the Foreman of the Jury in Trial by Jury, the First Citizen in The Yeomen of the Guard, and both Antonio and Annibale in The Gondoliers. He was also given the principal comic role of Major-General Stanley in The Pirates of Penzance. In the 1975 centenary season, Conroy-Ward played Lord Dramaleigh in the company's only revival of Utopia, Limited. In 1977 he added the role of Guron in Princess Ida to his repertory.

During a 1978 U.S. tour, the San Francisco Bay Area Reporter commented, "James Conroy-Ward... handled the role of Major General Stanley in Pirates better than anyone I can remember." Beginning in 1973, as Reed's understudy, he appeared frequently in all the principal comic roles: J. W. Wells in The Sorcerer, Sir Joseph Porter in Pinafore, Reginald Bunthorne in Patience, the Lord Chancellor in Iolanthe, King Gama in Princess Ida, Ko-Ko in The Mikado, Robin Oakapple in Ruddigore, Jack Point in Yeomen, and the Duke of Plaza-Toro in The Gondoliers. Of these, Conroy-Ward most enjoyed playing Jack Point and Gama but least enjoyed playing Robin.

In 1979, after the D'Oyly Carte company toured Australia and New Zealand, Reed left the company, and Conroy-Ward inherited the principal comic roles, except that he yielded the roles of General Stanley to his understudy Alistair Donkin and Robin Oakapple to Peter Lyon. He continued as the principal comedian of D'Oyly Carte until it closed in 1982, after which he went into telesales before joining a music publishing company. Conroy-Ward said of the last years of the company, "I think we could have had better producers [stage directors]. I think if we'd had a few more of the Anthony Beschs coming in a little bit earlier I don't think any harm would have been done."

== Recordings ==
Conroy-Ward participated in four recordings with the D'Oyly Carte Opera Company. In 1976, he sang the Herald in The Grand Duke and Lord Dramaleigh in Utopia, Limited. In 1977, he sang the role of Antonio and also spoke the role of Annibale in The Gondoliers. In 1982, he was a soloist on "The Last Night".
