= Iolanthe =

1882 comic opera by Gilbert & Sullivan

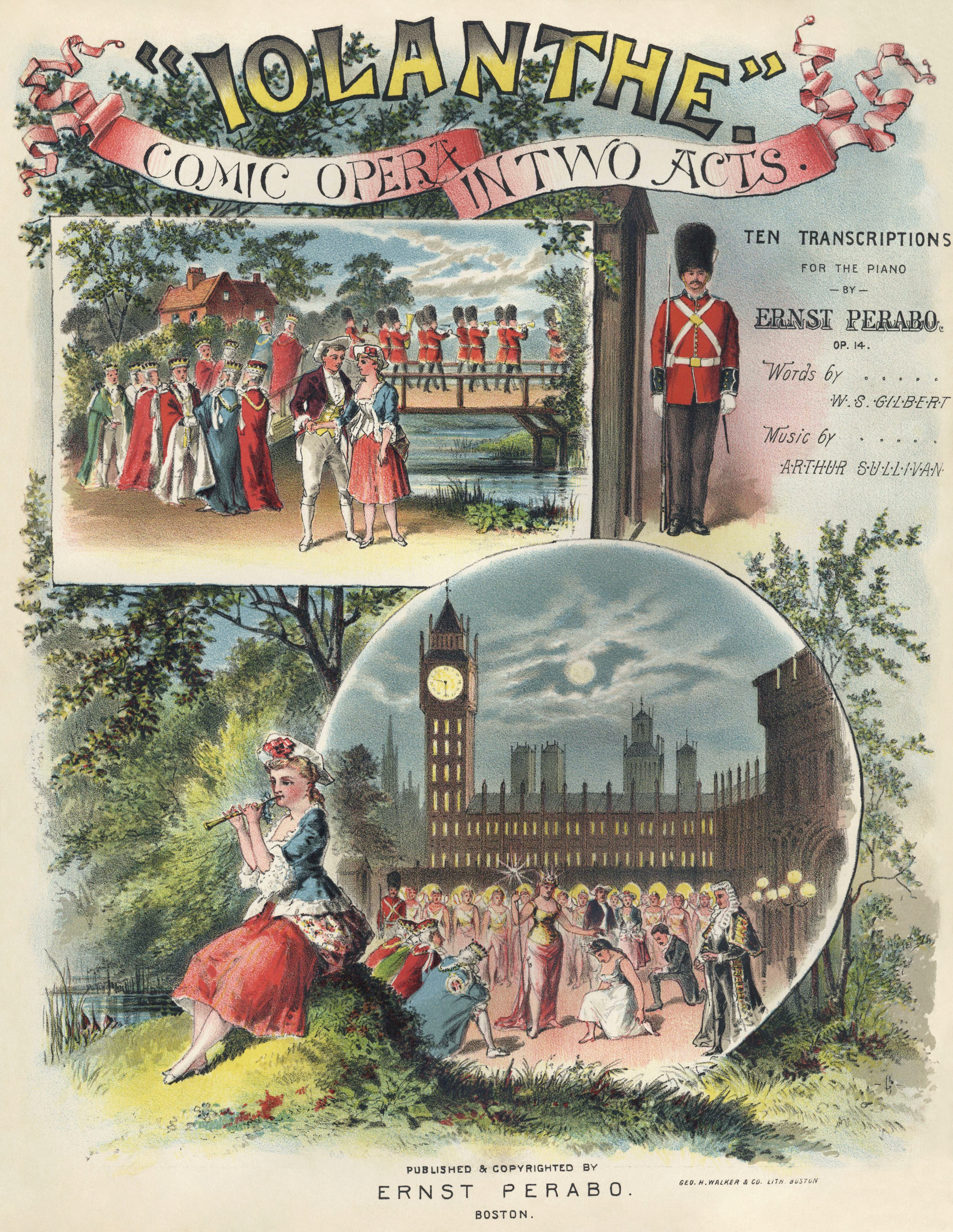
Cover of piano transcriptions, 1887

Iolanthe; or, The Peer and the Peri (/aɪ.oʊˈlænθi/) is a comic opera with music by Arthur Sullivan and libretto by W. S. Gilbert, first performed in 1882. It is one of the Savoy operas and is the seventh of fourteen operatic collaborations by Gilbert and Sullivan. In the opera, the fairy Iolanthe has been banished from fairyland because she married a mortal; this is forbidden by fairy law. Her son, Strephon, is an Arcadian shepherd who wants to marry Phyllis, a Ward of Chancery. All the members of the House of Peers also want to marry Phyllis. When Phyllis sees Strephon hugging a young woman (not knowing that it is his mother – immortal fairies all appear young), she assumes the worst and sets off a climactic confrontation between the peers and the fairies. The opera satirises many aspects of British government, law and society. The confrontation between the fairies and the peers is a version of one of Gilbert's favourite themes: a tranquil civilisation of women is disrupted by a male-dominated world through the discovery of mortal love.

Iolanthe opened in London on 25 November 1882, at the Savoy Theatre to a warm reception, and ran for 398 performances, the fourth consecutive hit by Gilbert and Sullivan. It was the first work to premiere at the Savoy (although Patience had transferred to the theatre in 1881) and was the first new theatre production in the world to be illuminated entirely with electric lights, permitting some special effects that had not been possible in the era of gas lighting. The opera opened simultaneously in New York, and touring companies were sent around the UK and US to play the piece. The first Australasian touring production followed in 1885, and the opera was revived in London beginning in 1901. The D'Oyly Carte Opera Company toured the opera nearly continuously in repertory from 1891 until 1982, and made several recordings of the opera over that period. Numerous other professional and amateur productions have been given of this enduring work, and various other recordings have been issued.

== Background ==
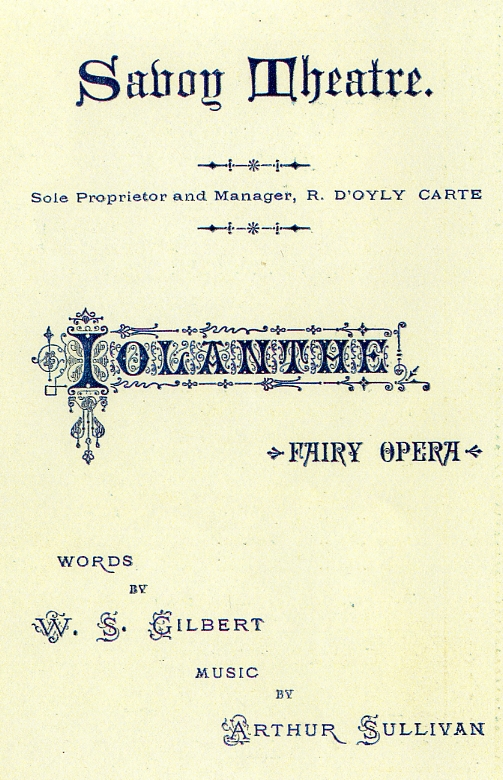
Programme from 1883 during the original run

W. S. Gilbert presented his basic idea for a new opera to Arthur Sullivan in October 1881. Gilbert's earliest ideas for the story of Iolanthe originated in his Bab Ballad, "The Fairy Curate": "Once a fairy / Light and airy / Married with a mortal". The fairy marries a "prosaic" attorney and bears him a son. After her son grows up, she visits him on Earth, but she is mistaken for his lover, since fairies perpetually appear young and beautiful. Sullivan found the premise funny, and Gilbert set to work on fleshing out the story. By December, he had written some lyrics for Sullivan to look at, but he struggled with the plot for several months, whereas he had dashed off earlier operas in a matter of weeks. During these months, Sullivan took an extended trip to Egypt, Italy and elsewhere. Upon his return to London in April 1882, he moved into a new home; in May, his beloved mother died rather suddenly. By the end of July 1882, Gilbert had supplied Sullivan with lyrics to several of the songs, and Sullivan began work setting them to music. Over the next two months, Sullivan met Gilbert to discuss the libretto as more lyrics were completed. Music rehearsals began in September, and staging began in October, scheduled around performances of Gilbert and Sullivan's previous opera, Patience, which had transferred to the Savoy Theatre a year earlier. Sullivan was still composing more numbers for the opera until 20 October, with a few modifications continuing into early November. Uncharacteristically, Sullivan composed the overture himself, instead of assigning it to an assistant. Two casts rehearsed simultaneously, as the opera was to open on the same night in London and New York City, a historic first for any play.

Gilbert had targeted the aristocracy and political officials for satiric treatment in earlier works. In this opera, the House of Lords is lampooned as a bastion of the ineffective, privileged and dim-witted, whose only qualification to govern is noble birth. The political party system, the law and other institutions also come in for a dose of satire. Throughout Iolanthe, however, both author and composer managed to couch the criticism among such bouncy, amiable absurdities and "splendid pageantry" that it is all received as good humour, with Prime Minister Gladstone complimenting the opera's good taste. In fact, Gilbert later refused to allow quotes from the piece to be used as part of the campaign to diminish the powers of the House of Lords.

Although titled Iolanthe all along in Gilbert's plot book, for a time the piece was advertised as Perola and rehearsed under that name. According to an often-repeated myth, Gilbert and Sullivan did not change the name to Iolanthe until just before the première. In fact, however, the title was advertised as Iolanthe as early as 13 November 1882 – eleven days before the opening – so the cast had at least that much time to learn the name. It is also clear that Sullivan's musical setting was written to match the cadence of the word "Iolanthe", and could only accommodate the word "Perola" by preceding it (awkwardly) with "O", "Come" or "Ah". Henry Irving had produced a W. G. Wills adaptation of King René's Daughter in London in 1880, under the name Iolanthe, and in October 1882 Gilbert asked his producer, Richard D'Oyly Carte, to request Irving's permission to use the name. It is not known whether Irving replied.

Iolanthe premiered only three days after Patience closed at the Savoy. The Savoy Theatre, opened only a year earlier, was a state-of-the-art facility, the first theatre in the world to be lit entirely by electricity. Patience had transferred to the Savoy from the Opera Comique, upon the theatre's opening, but Iolanthe was the first show to premiere at the theatre. New lighting technologies made such special effects as sparkling fairy wands possible for the first time. The principal fairies' heads were also lit by wreaths of small illuminated stars attached to a battery. The audience that attended the opening night in London included Captain (later Captain Sir) Eyre Massey Shaw, head of the Metropolitan Fire Brigade, whom the Fairy Queen apostrophises in the second act ("Oh, Captain Shaw / Type of true love kept under / Could thy brigade with cold cascade / Quench my great love, I wonder?"). On the first night Alice Barnett, as the Queen of the Fairies, sang the verses directly to Captain Shaw, who was sitting in the centre of the stalls.

The opera's premiere was received by an enthusiastic audience and earned critical praise, although there was general agreement that the second act needed some trimming. Iolanthe became the fourth consecutive major success for Gilbert, Sullivan and their producer, Richard D'Oyly Carte, following H.M.S. Pinafore (1878), The Pirates of Penzance (1879) and Patience (1881). Increasingly viewing his work with Gilbert as frivolous, beneath his skills and repetitious, Sullivan had intended to resign from the partnership with Gilbert and Carte after Iolanthe, but on the day of its premiere, he received a letter from his broker, Edward Hall, notifying him that Hall had lost all his money, including £7,000 of Sullivan's investments, the bulk of his fortune. Sullivan's lifestyle was not inexpensive, and he was helping to support his late brother's large family, as well as his mistress, Fanny Ronalds, and her family. He soon concluded that the only certain way to restore his financial security was to continue writing Savoy operas. On 8 February 1883, he signed a new five-year creative partnership agreement with Gilbert and Carte; Gilbert was already at work on their next piece, Princess Ida. On 22 May 1883, Sullivan was knighted by Queen Victoria for his "services ... rendered to the promotion of the art of music" in Britain.

== Roles ==
"She kisses just like other people!"

- The Lord Chancellor (comic baritone)
- George, Earl of Mountararat (baritone)
- Thomas, Earl Tolloller (tenor)
- Private Willis, of the Grenadier Guards (bass)
- Strephon, an Arcadian Shepherd (baritone)
- Queen of the Fairies (contralto)
- Iolanthe, a Fairy, Strephon's mother (mezzo-soprano)
- Celia, a Fairy (soprano)
- Leila, a Fairy (mezzo-soprano)
- Fleta, a Fairy (speaking role/chorus)
- Phyllis, an Arcadian Shepherdess and Ward in Chancery (soprano)
- Chorus of Dukes, Marquises, Earls, Viscounts, Barons, and Fairies

== Synopsis ==
Act I

The beloved fairy Iolanthe, who arranged the fairies' songs and dances, committed the capital crime (under fairy law) of marrying a mortal man. The Queen of the fairies commuted Iolanthe's sentence of death to banishment for life on the condition that she left her husband and never communicated with him again. After the passage of 25 years, the fairies, still missing Iolanthe deeply, plead with their Queen to pardon Iolanthe and to restore her place in fairyland ("Tripping hither, tripping thither").

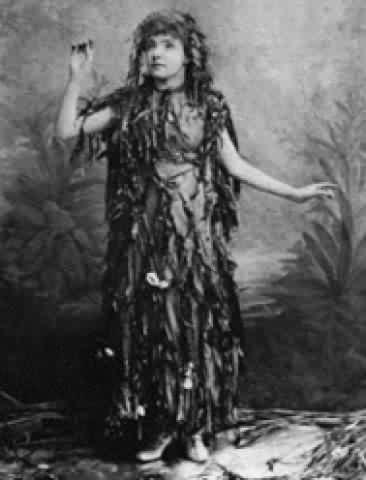
Jessie Bond as Iolanthe

Summoned by the Fairy Queen ("Iolanthe! From thy dark exile thou art summoned"), Iolanthe rises from the frog-infested stream that has been her home in exile. The Queen, unable to bear punishing her any longer, pardons Iolanthe, who is warmly greeted by the other fairies. Iolanthe tells her sisters that she has a son, Strephon, noting that he's a fairy down to the waist, but his legs are mortal. The fairies laugh that Iolanthe appears too young to have a grown son, as one of the advantages of a fairy's immortality is that they never grow old. Strephon, a handsome Arcadian shepherd, arrives and meets his aunts ("Good-morrow, good mother"). He tells Iolanthe of his love for the Lord Chancellor's ward of court, the beautiful Phyllis, who does not know of Strephon's mixed origin. Strephon is despondent, however, as the Lord Chancellor has forbidden them to marry, partly because he feels that a shepherd is unsuitable for Phyllis, but partly because the Lord Chancellor wishes to marry Phyllis himself. In fact, so do half the members of Britain's House of Lords. The Fairy Queen promises her assistance ("Fare thee well, attractive stranger"). Soon Phyllis arrives, and she and Strephon share a moment of tenderness as they plan their future and possible elopement ("Good-morrow, good lover"; "None shall part us from each other").

A cadre of the peers of the realm arrive in noisy splendour ("Loudly let the trumpet bray") with the Lord Chancellor ("The law is the true embodiment"). They are all smitten with Phyllis, and they have appealed to the Lord Chancellor to decide who will have her hand. The Lord Chancellor hesitates to act upon his own regard for Phyllis due to his position as her guardian. The Lords send for Phyllis to choose one of their number, but she will not marry any of them, as virtue is found only in a "lowly" cottage ("My well-loved Lord" and "Nay, tempt me not"). The peers beg her not to scorn them simply because of their "blue blood" ("Spurn not the nobly born" and "My lords, it may not be"). Strephon approaches the Lord Chancellor, pleading that Nature bids him marry Phyllis. But the Lord Chancellor wryly notes that Strephon has not presented sufficient evidence that Nature has interested herself in the matter. He refuses his consent to the marriage between Strephon and Phyllis ("When I went to the Bar").

Disappointed, Strephon calls on Iolanthe for help. She appears and promises to support her son. Spying on the two, the peers – led by the brainless and stuffy Earls Tolloller and Mountararat – together with Phyllis, see Iolanthe and Strephon in a warm embrace. All three jump to the obvious conclusion, since the centuries-old Iolanthe appears to be a girl of seventeen ("When darkly looms the day"). The peers scoff at the seemingly absurd claim that Iolanthe is Strephon's mother as Strephon pleads: "She is, has been, my mother from my birth!" Phyllis angrily rejects Strephon for his supposed infidelity and declares that she will marry either Lord Tolloller or Lord Mountararat ("...and I don't care which!"). Strephon then calls for help from the fairies, who appear but are mistaken by the peers for a girls' school on an outing. Offended, the Fairy Queen pronounces a magical "sentence" upon the peers: Strephon shall not only become a member of parliament but will also have the power to pass any bill he proposes ("With Strephon for your foe, no doubt").

Act II

Private Willis, on night guard duty, marches outside the Palace of Westminster and muses on political life ("When all night long a chap remains"). The fairies arrive and tease the peers about Strephon's parliamentary success; he is advancing a bill to open the peerage to competitive examination ("Strephon's a member of Parliament"). The peers ask the fairies to stop Strephon's mischief, stating that the House of Peers is not susceptible of any improvement ("When Britain really ruled the waves"). Although the fairies say that they cannot stop Strephon, they have become strongly attracted to the peers ("In vain to us you plead"). The fairy Queen is dismayed by this. Pointing to Private Willis of the First Grenadier Guards, who is still on duty, the Queen claims that she is able to subdue her response to the effects of his manly beauty ("Oh, foolish fay").

"In friendship's name!"

Phyllis cannot decide whether she ought to marry Tolloller or Mountararat, and so she leaves the choice up to them. Tolloller tells Mountararat that his family's tradition would require the two Earls to duel to the death if the latter were to claim Phyllis. The two decide that their friendship is more important than love and renounce their claims to her ("Though p'r'aps I may incur thy blame"). The Lord Chancellor arrives dressed for bed and describes a nightmare caused by his unrequited love for Phyllis ("Love, unrequited, robs me of my rest"). The two peers try to cheer him up and urge him to make another effort to persuade himself to award Phyllis to ... himself ("If you go in you're sure to win").

Strephon now leads both parties in Parliament, but he is miserable at losing Phyllis. He sees Phyllis and reveals to her that his mother is a fairy, which accounts for her apparent youth ("If we're weak enough to tarry"). Phyllis and Strephon ask Iolanthe to plead with the Lord Chancellor to allow their marriage, for "none can resist your fairy eloquence." This is impossible, she replies, for the Lord Chancellor is her husband. He believes Iolanthe to have died childless, and she is bound not to "undeceive" him, under penalty of death. However, to save Strephon from losing his love, Iolanthe resolves to present his case to the Lord Chancellor while veiled ("My lord, a suppliant at your feet").

Although the Lord Chancellor is moved by her appeal, which evokes the memory of his wife, he declares that he himself will marry Phyllis. Desperate, Iolanthe unveils, ignoring the warnings of the unseen Fairies, revealing that she is his long-lost wife, and Strephon is his son. The Lord Chancellor is amazed to see her alive, but Iolanthe has again broken fairy law, and the Fairy Queen is now left with no choice but to punish Iolanthe with death ("It may not be ... Once again thy vow is broken"). As she prepares to execute Iolanthe, the Queen learns that the rest of the fairies have chosen husbands from among the peers, thus also incurring death sentences – but the Queen blanches at the prospect of slaughtering all of them. The Lord Chancellor suggests a solution: change the law by inserting a single word: "every fairy shall die who doesn't marry a mortal." The Fairy Queen cheerfully agrees and, to save her life, the dutiful soldier, Private Willis, agrees to marry her. Seeing no reason to stay in the mortal realm if peers are to be recruited "from persons of intelligence", the peers join the fairy ranks and "away [they] go to fairyland" ("Soon as we may, off and away").

== Musical numbers ==
"Love, unrequited, robs me of my rest"
Charles H. Workman as the Lord Chancellor, 1910

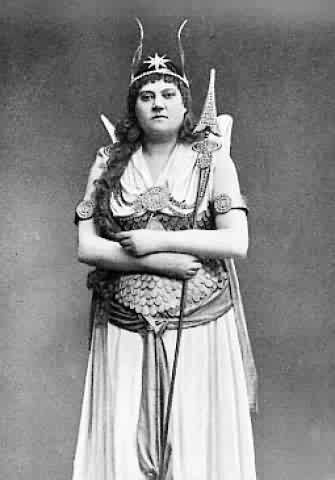
Barnett as The Fairy Queen

- Overture

Act I

- 1. "Tripping hither, tripping thither" (Celia, Leila, and Chorus of Fairies)
- 2. "Iolanthe! From thy dark exile thou art summoned" (Queen, Iolanthe, Celia, Leila, and Chorus of Fairies)
- 3. "Good-morrow, good mother" (Strephon and Chorus of Fairies)
- 4. "Fare thee well, attractive stranger" (Queen and Chorus of Fairies)
- 4a. "Good-morrow, good lover" (Phyllis and Strephon)
- 5. "None shall part us from each other" (Phyllis and Strephon)
- 6. "Loudly let the trumpet bray" (Chorus of Peers)
- 7. "The law is the true embodiment" (Lord Chancellor and Chorus of Peers)
- 8. "My well-loved Lord" and Barcarole, "Of all the young ladies I know" (Phyllis, Lord Tolloller, and Lord Mountararat)
- 9. "Nay, tempt me not" (Phyllis)
- 10. "Spurn not the nobly born" (Lord Tolloller and Chorus of Peers)
- 11. "My lords, it may not be" (Phyllis, Lord Tolloller, Lord Mountararat, Strephon, Lord Chancellor, and Chorus of Peers)
- 12. "When I went to the Bar" (Lord Chancellor)
- 13. Finale Act I (Ensemble)
  - "When darkly looms the day"
  - "The lady of my love has caught me talking to another"
  - "Go away, madam"
  - "Henceforth Strephon, cast away"
  - "With Strephon for your foe, no doubt / Young Strephon is the kind of lout"

Act II

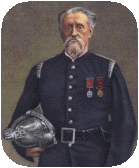
Capt. Eyre Massey Shaw

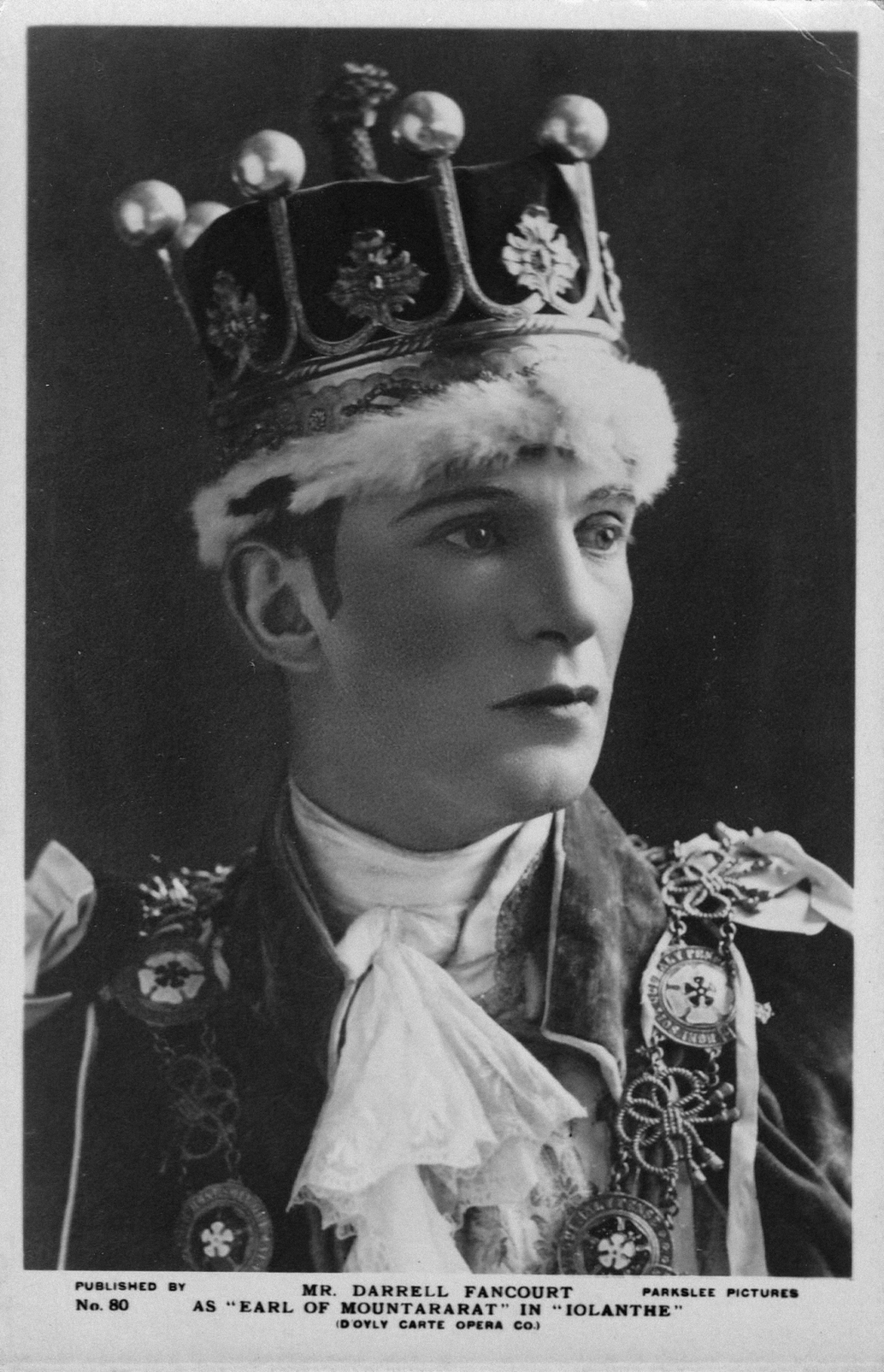
Darrell Fancourt as Lord Mountararat

- 14. "When all night long a chap remains" (Private Willis)
- 15. "Strephon's a member of Parliament" (Chorus of Fairies and Peers)
- 16. "When Britain really ruled the waves" (Lord Mountararat and Chorus)
- 17. "In vain to us you plead" (Leila, Celia, Chorus of Fairies, Mountararat, Tolloller, and Chorus of Peers)
- 18. "Oh, foolish fay" (Queen with Chorus of Fairies)
- 19. "Though p'r'aps I may incur thy blame" (Phyllis, Lord Mountararat, Lord Tolloller, and Private Willis)
- 20. "Love, unrequited, robs me of my rest" ... "When you're lying awake" (Lord Chancellor)
- 21. "If you go in you're sure to win" (Lord Tolloller, Lord Mountararat, and Lord Chancellor)
- 22. "If we're weak enough to tarry" (Phyllis and Strephon)
- 23. "My lord, a suppliant at your feet" (Iolanthe)
- 24. "It may not be" (Lord Chancellor, Iolanthe, and Chorus of Fairies)
- 25. "Soon as we may, off and away" (Ensemble)

=== Deleted songs ===
- 8a. "On you they'd set a coronet" (Phyllis, Lord Tolloller, Lord Mountararat, Lord Chancellor, Chorus of Peers) was cut during the rehearsal period. This number, for quartet and male chorus, was intended to be performed before "Nay, tempt me not". The music was thought lost, but in 2026, the researcher Marc Shepherd found a copyist's full score at the British Library that includes this number and published it the same year.
- 18a. "My love for him is dead" (Phyllis) was cut during the rehearsal period. The number followed "Oh, foolish fay" and preceded (the also cut) "De Belville was regarded as the Crichton of his age". The music, thought lost, was found and published in 2026 together with 8a and 18b.
- 18b. "De Belville was regarded as the Crichton of his age" (Mountararat) was cut shortly after the opening night of Iolanthe. The number appeared soon after Mountararat's Act II entrance, after Phyllis says that Strephon "goes about with a mother considerably younger than himself". In a short dialogue (also cut) Phyllis asks how people become peers, and Mountararat offers, as an example, this patter song about the fictional polymath De Belville. Government was at a loss as to how to reward him for his gifts, until he inherited millions and obtained a seat in Parliament and "a taste for making inconvenient speeches in the House" (of Commons). He was rewarded by being removed from that House and given a peerage. The song was recited on the first night in London, rather than sung, and the middle stanza omitted, and sung at the New York premiere. The music, thought lost, was found and published by Shepherd in 2026.
- 21a. "Fold your flapping wings" (Strephon) was sung on the first night and cut soon afterwards. The song, preceded by a recitative for Strephon ("My bill has now been read a second time") appeared shortly after #21, following the exit of the two Earls and the Lord Chancellor and the entrance of Strephon. The lyrics make the case that bad behaviour by the underclasses is caused by their unfortunate circumstances: "I might be as bad – as unlucky, rather – if I only had Fagin for a father." The tone of the song is dark and angry, in marked contrast with the generally genial tone of Iolanthe. Although most productions continue to omit it, the song has been used in some modern productions and as a separate concert piece.

== Musical and textual analysis ==
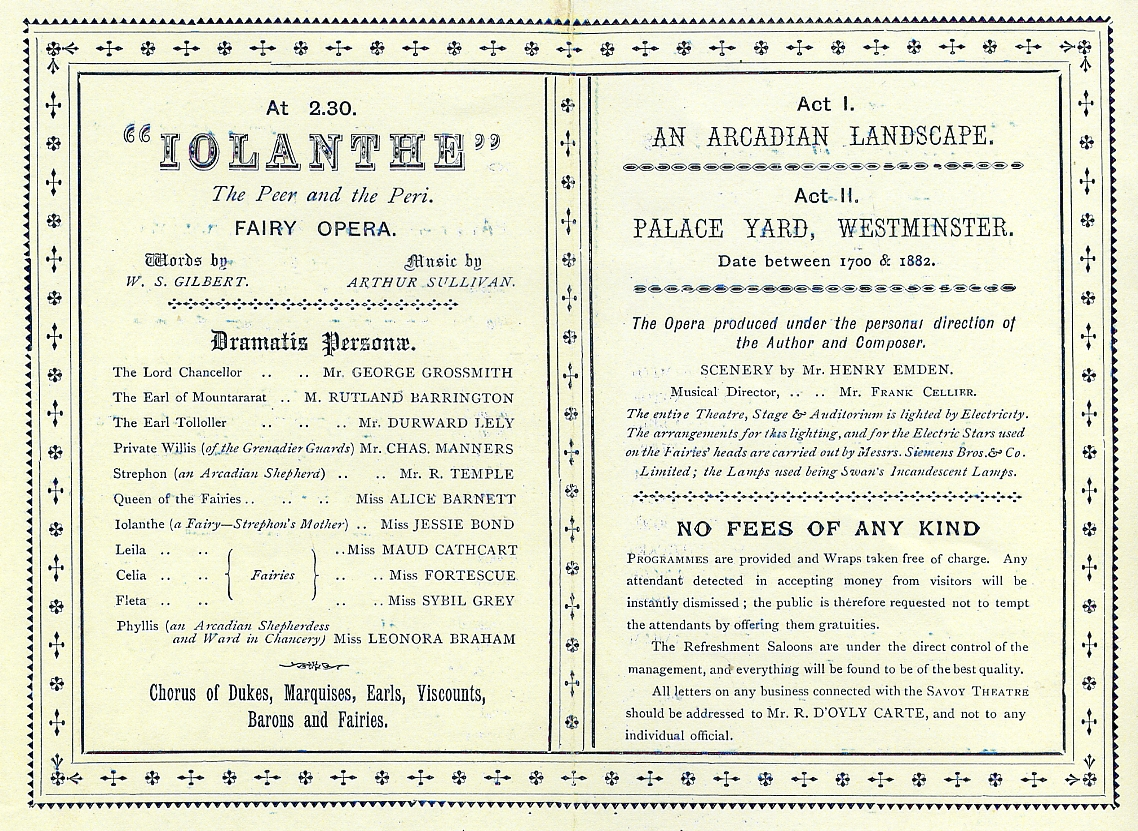
Inside of the programme

At the time they wrote Iolanthe, both Gilbert and Sullivan were in their peak creative years, and Iolanthe, their seventh work together, drew the best from both composer and author. Sullivan's biographer, Arthur Jacobs, wrote: "[Sullivan] had composed a brilliant new score (his most subtle yet) to a scintillating libretto. ... Iolanthe is the work in which Sullivan's operetta style takes a definite step forward, and metamorphosis of musical themes is its characteristic new feature. ... By recurrence and metamorphosis of themes Sullivan made the score more fluid". Sullivan's overture was superior in structure and orchestration to those that his assistants had constructed for the earlier operas. Much of his "fairy" music pays deliberate homage to the incidental music written by Felix Mendelssohn for an 1842 production of Shakespeare's A Midsummer Night's Dream. Richard Wagner's Ring cycle premiered in London earlier in 1882. The music for the fairies reflects Wagner's style, and the score uses leitmotifs, including a distinctive four-note theme associated with the character of Iolanthe. The Fairy Queen's music parodies that of Wagnerian heroines such as Brünnhilde. The score is wider in range of emotion and style, with innovative use of pizzicato strings, clever and varied underscoring of patter, the tender, sentimental eleventh-hour number for the title character, apt matching of the music to the absurd comedy of the lyrics, and a sustained first act finale with a series of dramatic situations that ends with the confrontation between the fairies and peers.

Gilbert, too, was influenced by earlier works, including The Mountain Sylph by John Barnett. Two characters in Iolanthe, Strephon and Phyllis, are described as Arcadian shepherds. Arcadia was a legendary site of rural perfection, first described by the Ancient Greeks, that was a popular setting for writers of the 19th century. Gilbert had written an earlier work called Happy Arcadia. He had also created several "fairy comedies" at the Haymarket Theatre in the early 1870s. These plays, influenced by the fairy work of James Planché, are founded upon the idea of self-revelation by characters under the influence of some magic or some supernatural interference. Several of Iolanthe's themes are continued from Patience, including the battle between the sexes and the satire on legal and political themes. Iolanthe is one of several of Gilbert's works, including among others The Wicked World, Broken Hearts, Fallen Fairies and Princess Ida, where the introduction of males into a tranquil world of women brings "mortal love" that wreaks havoc with the status quo.

Gilbert's absurdist style is on full display in Iolanthe. For example, all the members of the House of Lords are in love with Phyllis, a ward of the Lord Chancellor. Gilbert satirically sets up the fantastical fairies as the agents of common sense in contrast with the nonsensical peers, who should be sober parliamentarians, while the most poetically romantic of the fairies, the "Arcadian" shepherd, Strephon, is chosen to lead both houses of Parliament. One of Gilbert's biographers, Andrew Crowther wrote: "The things that make [the opera] memorable as a work of art [include] the peers entering in the full pomp of their formal robes, magnificent and ridiculous." Among many pot-shots that Gilbert takes at lawyers in this opera, the Lord Chancellor sings that, as a young lawyer, he decided to "work on a new and original plan" similar to the practice in other professions, that diligence, honesty, honour and merit should lead to promotion. Gilbert uses the "fairy law" as a proxy for mortal law, in which an "equity draughtsman" can, with "the insertion of a single word", change the entire meaning of the law. Crowther notes: "All kinds of tone ... mingle in this opera: whimsy, fantasy, romance, wit and political satire."

== Productions ==
Early 20th-century poster by H. M. Brock

Iolanthe had a successful initial run in London of 398 performances, spanning the holiday seasons of both 1882 and 1883. Gilbert designed the costumes himself, and sets were by the Drury Lane designer Henry Emden. In an unprecedented first for any play, the New York premiere was given on the same date – 25 November 1882, with the composer's assistant, Alfred Cellier, conducting there. In Australia, Iolanthe was first seen on 9 May 1885 at the Theatre Royal, Melbourne, produced by J. C. Williamson.

In the British provinces, Iolanthe played – either by itself, or in repertory – continuously from February 1882 through 1885, then not again until late 1891. From then on, it was always present in the D'Oyly Carte Opera Company's touring repertory, being included in some part of every season until the company's closure in 1982. The costumes were redesigned by Percy Anderson and Atillio Comelli in 1915 and by George Sheringham in 1932, and Peter Goffin designed new sets in 1957 and some new costumes in 1960. After its original production, Iolanthe was not revived in London until 1901, making it the first of the operas to be revived after the composer's death the year before. It was also included in two Savoy repertory seasons, in 1907 and 1908–09.

Iolanthe was the first Gilbert and Sullivan opera performed professionally in Britain by a non-D'Oyly Carte company. It was produced by the Sadler's Wells Opera (now English National Opera) in January 1962, immediately after the Gilbert copyrights expired. It was well received and was successfully revived for many seasons by Sadler's Wells until 1978. Michael Heyland restaged Iolanthe for D'Oyly Carte in 1977, the year of Queen Elizabeth's Silver Jubilee, with silver-themed designs. Iolanthe has remained one of the most popular of the Gilbert and Sullivan works. Thousands of professional and amateur productions of the opera have been given throughout the English-speaking world, and the opera continues to be performed regularly today. The Internet Broadway Database lists 20 productions of the opera on Broadway alone.

The following table shows the history of the D'Oyly Carte productions in Gilbert's lifetime (not including touring companies):

| Theatre | Opening date | Closing date | Perfs. | Details |
|---|---|---|---|---|
| Savoy Theatre | 25 November 1882 | 1 January 1884 | 398 | |
| Standard Theatre, New York City | 25 November 1882 | 24 February 1883 | 105 | Authorised American production |
| Savoy Theatre | 7 December 1901 | 29 March 1902 | 113 | First London revival |
| Savoy Theatre | 11 June 1907 | 23 August 1907 | 43 | First Savoy repertory season; played with three other operas. Closing date shown is of the entire season. |
| Savoy Theatre | 19 October 1908 | 27 March 1909 | 38 | Second Savoy repertory season; played with five other operas. Closing date shown is of the entire season. |

== Historical casting ==
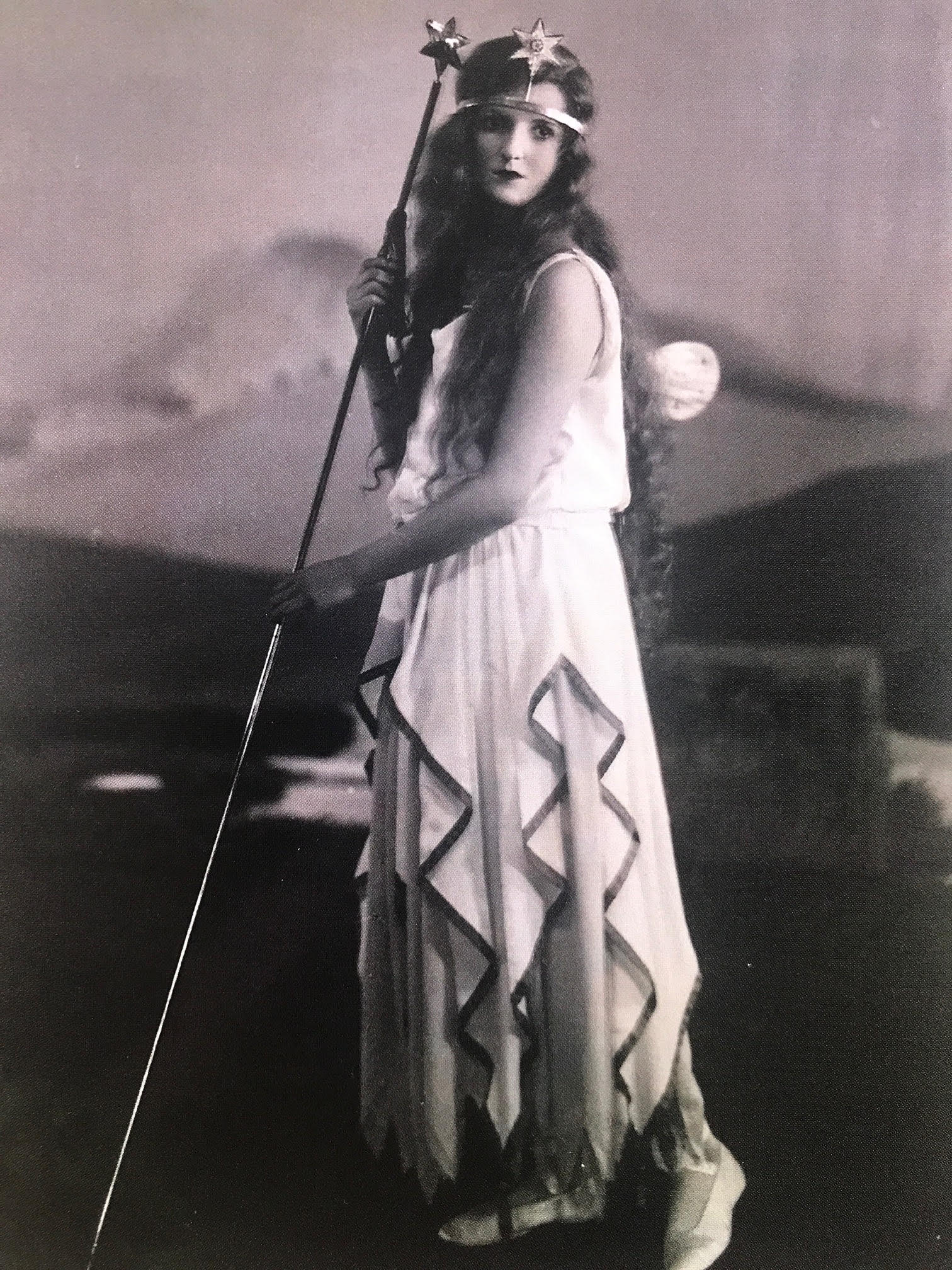
Eileen Sharp as Iolanthe (1924)

The following tables show the casts of the principal original productions and D'Oyly Carte Opera Company touring repertory at various times through to the company's 1982 closure:

| Role | Savoy Theatre 1882 | Standard Theatre 1882 | Savoy Theatre 1901 | Savoy Theatre 1907 | Savoy Theatre 1908 |
|---|---|---|---|---|---|
| Lord Chancellor | George Grossmith | J. H. Ryley | Walter Passmore | Charles H. Workman | Charles H. Workman |
| Mountararat | Rutland Barrington | Arthur Wilkinson | Powis Pinder | Frank Wilson | Rutland Barrington |
| Tolloller | Durward Lely | Llewellyn Cadwaladr | Robert Evett | Harold Wilde | Henry Herbert |
| Private Willis | Charles Manners | Lithgow James | Reginald Crompton | Overton Moyle | Leo Sheffield |
| Strephon | Richard Temple | William T. Carleton | Henry Lytton | Henry Lytton | Henry Lytton |
| Fairy Queen | Alice Barnett | Augusta Roche | Rosina Brandram | Louie René | Louie René |
| Iolanthe | Jessie Bond | Marie Jansen | Louie Pounds | Bessel Adams | Jessie Rose |
| Celia | May Fortescue | Mina Rowley | Agnes Fraser | Violette Londa | Dorothy Court |
| Leila | Julia Gwynne | Kate Forster | Isabel Agnew | Beatrice Meredith | Beatrice Boarer |
| Fleta | Sybil Grey | Billie Barlow | Winifred Hart-Dyke | Ernestine Gauthier | Ethel Lewis |
| Phyllis | Leonora Braham | Sallie Reber | Isabel Jay | Clara Dow | Elsie Spain |

| Role | D'Oyly Carte 1915 Tour | D'Oyly Carte 1925 Tour | D'Oyly Carte 1935 Tour | D'Oyly Carte 1945 Tour | D'Oyly Carte 1951 Tour |
|---|---|---|---|---|---|
| Lord Chancellor | Henry Lytton | Henry Lytton | Martyn Green | Grahame Clifford | Martyn Green |
| Mountararat | Frederick Hobbs | Darrell Fancourt | Darrell Fancourt | Darrell Fancourt | Eric Thornton |
| Tolloller | Walter Glynne | Sidney Pointer | John Dean | Herbert Garry | Leonard Osborn |
| Private Willis | Leo Sheffield | Leo Sheffield | Sydney Granville | L. Radley Flynn | Richard Watson |
| Strephon | Leicester Tunks | Henry Millidge | Leslie Rands | Leslie Rands | Alan Styler |
| Fairy Queen | Bertha Lewis | Bertha Lewis | Dorothy Gill | Ella Halman | Ella Halman |
| Iolanthe | Nellie Briercliffe | Aileen Davies | Marjorie Eyre | Marjorie Eyre | Joan Gillingham |
| Celia | Ethel Armit | Hilary Davies | Ann Drummond-Grant | Ana Nicholson | Enid Walsh |
| Leila | Betty Grylls | Beatrice Elburn | Elizabeth Nickell-Lean | Doreen Binnion | Joyce Wright |
| Fleta | Kitty Twinn | Dorothy Gates | Kathleen Naylor | Margaret Mitchell | Henrietta Steytler |
| Phyllis | Elsie McDermid | Winifred Lawson | Doreen Denny | Helen Roberts | Margaret Mitchell |

| Role | D'Oyly Carte 1955 Tour | D'Oyly Carte 1965 Tour | D'Oyly Carte 1975 Tour | D'Oyly Carte 1982 Tour |
|---|---|---|---|---|
| Lord Chancellor | Peter Pratt | John Reed | John Reed | James Conroy-Ward |
| Mountararat | Donald Adams | Donald Adams | John Ayldon | John Ayldon |
| Tolloller | Leonard Osborn | David Palmer | Meston Reid | Geoffrey Shovelton |
| Private Willis | Fisher Morgan | Kenneth Sandford | Kenneth Sandford | Kenneth Sandford |
| Strephon | Alan Styler | Thomas Lawlor | Michael Rayner | Peter Lyon |
| Fairy Queen | Ann Drummond-Grant | Christene Palmer | Lyndsie Holland | Patricia Leonard |
| Iolanthe | Joyce Wright | Peggy Ann Jones | Judi Merri | Lorraine Daniels |
| Celia | Maureen Melvin | Jennifer Marks | Marjorie Williams | Margaret Lynn-Williams |
| Leila | Beryl Dixon | Pauline Wales | Patricia Leonard | Helene Witcombe |
| Fleta | Margaret Dobson | Elizabeth Mynett | Rosalind Griffiths | Alexandra Hann |
| Phyllis | Cynthia Morey | Valerie Masterson | Pamela Field | Sandra Dugdale |

== Selected recordings ==
Of the D'Oyly Carte Opera Company recordings of this opera, the 1930 and 1960 recordings have been the best received, and the latter includes the dialogue. The revived D'Oyly Carte's 1991 recording contains Strephon's cut number "Fold Your Flapping Wings" as a bonus track.

On video are the 1982 Brent Walker production and more recent performances from the International Gilbert and Sullivan Festival.

- 1930 D'Oyly Carte – Conductor: Malcolm Sargent
- 1951 D'Oyly Carte – Conductor: Isidore Godfrey
- 1960 D'Oyly Carte (with dialogue) – New Symphony Orchestra of London, Band of the Grenadier Guards, Conductor: Isidore Godfrey
- 1982 Brent Walker Productions (video) – Ambrosian Opera Chorus, London Symphony Orchestra, Conductor: Alexander Faris; Stage Director: David Pountney
- 1991 D'Oyly Carte – Conductor: John Pryce-Jones
- 2013 Lamplighters Music Theatre (with dialogue) – Conductor: Baker Peeples

== Cultural influence ==
Lithograph, c. 1883: "Nay Tempt Me Not"

British politics

When Margaret Thatcher was elected as Prime Minister, the press joked about the line from the opera, "This comes of women interfering in politics!" Lord Falconer, who served as Tony Blair's second Lord Chancellor, was reportedly influenced by Iolanthe in his moves to reform or disband the office.

Effect upon Chief Justice Rehnquist

William H. Rehnquist, former Chief Justice of the United States, was an avid Gilbert and Sullivan fan and was inspired by the costume of the Lord Chancellor, in a production of Iolanthe, to add four golden stripes to the sleeves of his judicial robes. The next Chief Justice, John G. Roberts Jr., did not retain the ornamentation. In 1980, while an Associate Justice, Rehnquist, in his dissenting opinion in the case of Richmond Newspapers, Inc. v. Virginia, compares these words of the Lord Chancellor to the "flavor from the various opinions supporting the judgment in this case": The Law is the true embodiment/Of everything that's excellent,/It has no kind of fault or flaw,/And I, My Lords, embody the Law.

Adaptations

The Ratepayers' Iolanthe was a 1984 musical adapted by Ned Sherrin and Alistair Beaton. Sherrin directed and won a Laurence Olivier Award for Outstanding Achievement in a Musical for the musical's "conception".

Literature and music

The science fiction writer Isaac Asimov was a Gilbert and Sullivan fan. His Foundation Trilogy was conceived after his reading Iolanthe started a train of thought about military empires. Also, in "Runaround", a story in Asimov's I, Robot, a robot, while in a state similar to drunkenness, sings snippets of Gilbert and Sullivan songs, including "The Nightmare Song" from Iolanthe. In Michael Chabon's 2004 novel The Final Solution, Bruno the parrot sings bits from Iolanthe. The eponymous hero of David Nobbs' The Fall and Rise of Reginald Perrin has "Iolanthe" as a middle name, allegedly due to his being born during a performance of the opera. An illustrated booklet, A Parody on Iolanthe, was written and published by D. Dalziel in 1883 and concerns the Chicago & Alton Railway.

In his 1974 album Todd, Todd Rundgren performs the "Lord Chancellor's Nightmare Song" ("When you're lying awake...").

== See also ==
- Mount Ararat, after which one of the characters, Lord Mountararat, is named.
- Deceased Wife's Sister's Marriage Act 1907, proposals for which are mentioned in the opera
