= The Yeomen of the Guard =

1888 comic opera by Gilbert and Sullivan

Scene from The Yeomen of the Guard D'Oyly Carte Opera Company 1906 Revival

The Yeomen of the Guard; or, The Merryman and His Maid, is a Savoy Opera, with music by Arthur Sullivan and libretto by W. S. Gilbert. It premiered at the Savoy Theatre on 3 October 1888 and ran for 423 performances. This was the eleventh collaboration of fourteen between Gilbert and Sullivan.

The opera is set in the Tower of London during the 16th century, and is the darkest, and perhaps most emotionally engaging, of the Savoy Operas, ending with a broken-hearted main character and two very reluctant engagements, rather than the usual numerous marriages. The libretto does contain considerable humour, including a lot of pun-laden one-liners, but Gilbert's trademark satire and topsy-turvy plot complications are subdued in comparison with the other Gilbert and Sullivan operas. The dialogue, though in prose, is quasi-Shakespearean, or early modern English, in style.

Critics considered the score to be Sullivan's finest, including its overture, which is in sonata form, rather than being written as a sequential pot-pourri of tunes from the opera, as in most of the other Gilbert and Sullivan overtures. This was the first Savoy Opera to use Sullivan's larger orchestra, including a second bassoon and third trombone. Most of Sullivan's subsequent operas, including those not composed with Gilbert as librettist, use this larger orchestra.

== Background ==
1883 poster similar to the one Gilbert said gave him the inspiration for the opera

When the previous Gilbert and Sullivan opera, Ruddigore, finished its run at the Savoy Theatre, no new Gilbert and Sullivan opera was ready, and for nearly a year the stage was devoted to revivals of the company's old successes H.M.S. Pinafore, The Pirates of Penzance and The Mikado. For several years leading up to the premiere of Yeomen, Sullivan had expressed the desire to leave his partnership with W.S. Gilbert in order to turn to writing grand opera and other serious works full-time. Before the premiere of Yeomen, Sullivan had recently been lauded for the successful cantata The Golden Legend and would produce his grand opera, Ivanhoe, only 15 months after Yeomen.

In the autumn of 1887, after another attempt to interest his collaborator in a plot where the characters, by swallowing a magic pill, became who they were pretending to be (Sullivan had rejected this idea before), Gilbert made an effort to meet his collaborator half way. Gilbert claimed that the idea for the opera came to him while he was waiting for the train in Uxbridge and spotted an advertisement for The Tower Furnishing and Finance Company, illustrated with a Beefeater. On Christmas Day, 1887, he read to Sullivan and Carte his plot sketch for an opera set at the Tower of London. Sullivan was "immensely pleased" and, with much relief, accepted it, writing in his diary, "Pretty story, no topsy turvydom, very human, & funny also".

Although not a grand opera, Yeomen provided Sullivan with the opportunity to write his most ambitious score to date. The two set to work on the new opera, taking longer to prepare it than they had taken with many of their earlier works. Gilbert made every effort to accommodate his collaborator, even writing alternative lyrics to some songs. Sullivan had trouble setting one lyric in particular, "I have a song to sing-O!", with its increasing length in each stanza. He asked Gilbert if he had anything in mind when writing it. Gilbert hummed a few lines from a sea shanty, and Sullivan knew what to do.

The first act was rather long and contained an unusual number of sentimental pieces. As opening night approached, Gilbert became increasingly apprehensive. Would the audience accept this serious, sentimental tone from one of the duo's "comic" operas? Gilbert and Sullivan cut two songs from Act I and part of the Act I finale, partly to decrease the number of sentimental pieces near the beginning of the opera. Gilbert, always nervous himself on opening nights, came backstage before the performance on opening night to "have a word" with some of the actors, inadvertently conveying his worries to the cast and making them even more nervous. Jessie Bond, who was to open the show with a solo song alone on stage, recalled saying to him, "For Heaven's sake, Mr. Gilbert, go away and leave me alone, or I shan't be able to sing a note!"

== Roles ==
W. H. Denny (Wilfred) and Jessie Bond (Phœbe), 1888

- Sir Richard Cholmondeley (pronounced Chum'lee), Lieutenant of the Tower (baritone)
- Colonel Fairfax, under sentence of death (tenor)
- Sergeant Meryll of the Yeomen of the Guard (bass-baritone)
- Leonard Meryll, his son (tenor)
- Jack Point, a strolling jester (comic baritone)
- Wilfred Shadbolt, Head Jailer and Assistant Tormentor (bass-baritone or baritone)
- The Headsman (silent)
- First Yeoman (tenor)
- Second Yeoman (baritone)
- Third Yeoman (tenor) – see "Cut music"
- Fourth Yeoman (bass) – see "Cut music"
- First Citizen (speaking/chorus)
- Second Citizen (speaking/chorus)
- Elsie Maynard, a strolling singer (soprano)
- Phœbe Meryll, Sergeant Meryll's daughter (mezzo-soprano)
- Dame Carruthers, Housekeeper to the Tower (contralto)
- Kate, her niece (soprano)
- Chorus of Yeomen Warders, gentlemen, citizens, etc.

== Synopsis ==
=== Act I ===
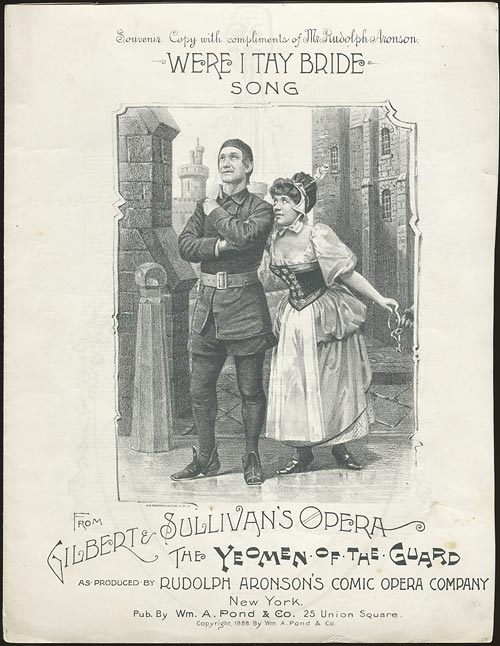
Souvenir illustration from the New York Casino Theatre production, 1888

Phoebe Meryll sits at the spinning wheel, sighing about the pain of love. Wilfred Shadbolt – the head jailer and assistant torturer at the Tower of London – arrives, and Phoebe mocks him, disgusted by his profession. Wilfred, who is in love with Phoebe, has noticed her interest in one of the prisoners at the Tower, Colonel Fairfax. He gleefully conveys the news that Fairfax is to be beheaded, for the crime of sorcery, that very day. Phoebe replies that Fairfax is merely a scientist and alchemist, and also handsome, and leaves Wilfred to suffer from his love for her. The citizens and Yeomen arrive, singing of the Yeomen's bravery and valiant deeds. Dame Carruthers, the housekeeper of the Tower, dismisses protestations by Phoebe of Fairfax's innocence and, vexed by Phoebe's criticism of the Tower, sings its praises. After everyone leaves, Phoebe is joined by her father, Sergeant Meryll, who reports that her brother Leonard has been appointed a Yeoman for his valour in battle. Leonard is on his way from Windsor, where the court sits, and may bring with him a reprieve for the Colonel. Leonard Meryll enters bearing a dispatch for the Lieutenant of the Tower but no reprieve. Sergeant Meryll is eager to save Fairfax, for the Colonel served with him in battle and twice saved Sergeant Meryll's life. He hatches a plan: Leonard will hide away and Fairfax, sprung from his cell, will assume Leonard's guise. Phoebe is charged with getting the key to Fairfax's cell from the lovesick jailer, Wilfred.

Fairfax enters under guard by an escort of Yeomen. Sir Richard Cholmondeley, the Lieutenant of the Tower, sees him and greets him sadly, as they are old friends. Fairfax bears his impending execution bravely and philosophically, prompting tears from Phoebe and even Sergeant Meryll. Fairfax asks a boon of the Lieutenant: the charge of sorcery was the doing of his wicked cousin Sir Clarence Poltwhistle, a Secretary of State, who will inherit his estate if he dies unmarried. He therefore wishes to be married by his confessor to any available woman, it matters not whom, who will receive a hundred crowns for her hour of matrimony. The Lieutenant agrees and leaves.

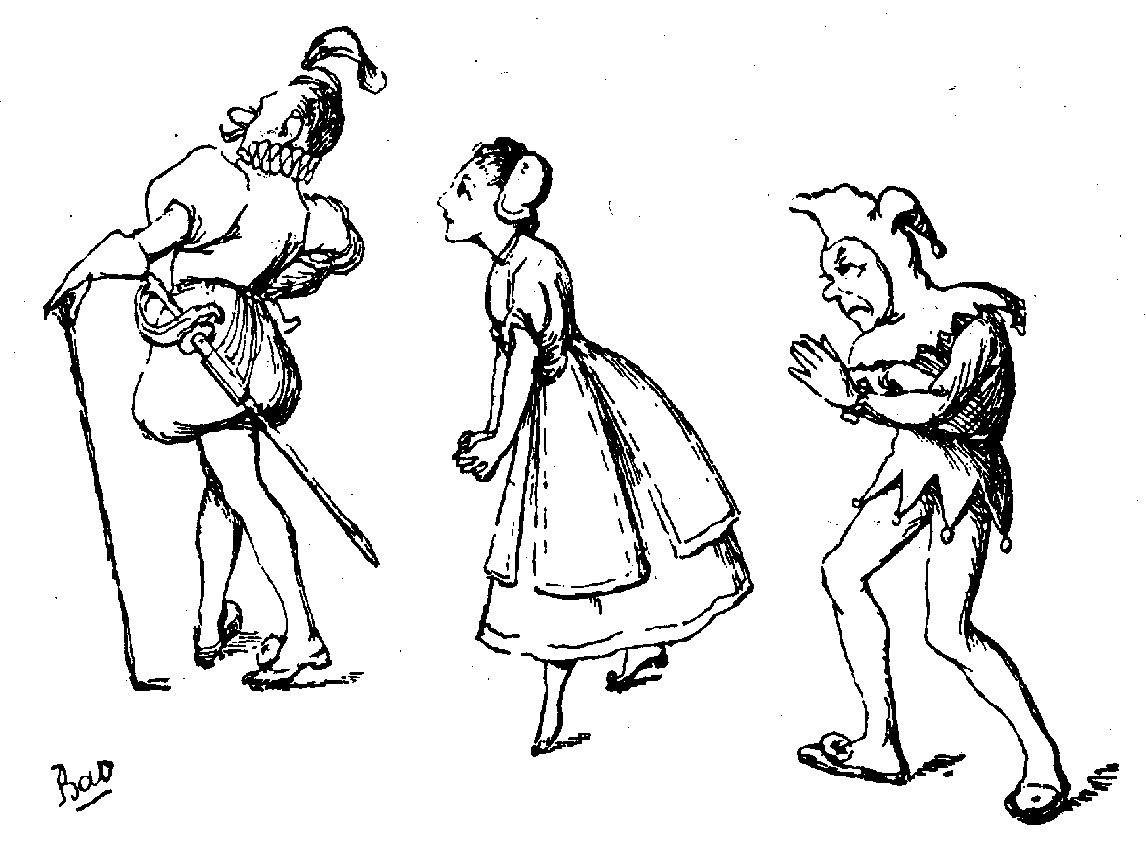
Gilbert's illustration of "I have a song to sing, O!"

Jack Point, a jester, and Elsie Maynard, a young singer, are pursued by a rowdy crowd that demands merriment and threatens the two strolling players. Elsie, objecting to a man's rude attentions, boxes his ears, which gives Point a moment to quieten and amuse the crowd. The two entertainers offer to perform the song of The Merryman and his Maid: it tells of a lovelorn merryman who is jilted by a maiden in favour of an arrogant lord, but the latter rejects her, and she returns on her knees to the merryman to beg for his love, and all ends happily. The song over, the crowd grows unruly again, and violence is averted only by the Lieutenant's arrival. Point and Elsie introduce themselves and explain that Elsie's mother Bridget is very ill and they seek money to buy medicine for her. The Lieutenant offers Elsie a chance to earn a hundred crowns (a very substantial sum) by marrying a condemned gentleman immediately. Point, who intends to marry Elsie someday, is assured that the groom will be beheaded directly after the ceremony. Elsie consents and is blindfolded and led off by Wilfred for the secret ceremony. The Lieutenant tells Point that he has a vacancy for a jester, and Point tells him of his skills and tries out some jokes. The Lieutenant leads Point off to discuss the employment further.

Wilfred leads Elsie back from her anonymous meeting with the priest and the prisoner and leaves her to reflect on her impending widowhood. Meanwhile, Wilfred wonders what they were up to in Fairfax's cell. Phoebe arrives and seductively distracts him as she steals his keys, which she gives surreptitiously to her father, who goes to free Fairfax from his cell. She keeps Wilfred busy until her father returns the keys, which she returns to Wilfred's belt, and leaves the confused and hopeful jailer to his fantasies of marrying her. Meryll disguises Fairfax as his son Leonard.

Geraldine Ulmar as Elsie (original production)

The Yeomen come to greet "Leonard", who insists that the tales of his bravery are exaggerated. He flounders when Phoebe greets him, not having been introduced to her, but Wilfred helpfully identifies her, telling Fairfax (with a strong dose of wishful thinking) that he, Wilfred, is betrothed to Phoebe. He commends her to the care of her "brother" until the marriage. The headsman enters, and all is ready for the execution. Wilfred, Fairfax (still disguised as Leonard) and two Yeomen go to fetch Fairfax. The Yeomen return and Fairfax announces his own disappearance. The Lieutenant blames the jailer, Wilfred, and declares his life forfeit instead. Wilfred protests his innocence and all wonder – not all honestly – how the prisoner could have escaped. Point is distraught at the escape of Elsie's husband, and Elsie faints into Fairfax's arms, as all rush off to hunt for Fairfax.

=== Act II ===
Two days have passed, and the Yeomen continue searching in vain for the escaped prisoner. Dame Carruthers enters with her niece Kate and berates the Yeomen for letting Fairfax escape. Jack Point (now employed by the Lieutenant), sits brushing up on his jests and bitterly reflecting on his profession, when Wilfred comes by. Point taunts the failed jailer, and Wilfred says he'd rather be a jester. This gives Point an idea. He reveals the secret wedding and agrees to teach the oaf the art of jesting if Wilfred will publicly swear that Wilfred shot Fairfax dead as he swam across the river to escape. Wilfred agrees to swear to this lie.

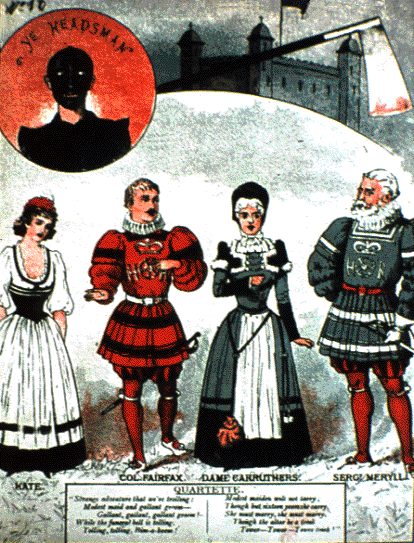
"Strange Adventure, Maiden Wedded"

Meanwhile, Fairfax, still disguised as Leonard Meryll, laments his hurried marriage to a bride he cannot identify, for her face was concealed by the blindfold. Sergeant Meryll says that Elsie, the girl who fainted at the execution, and who has been placed in Meryll's charge, has recovered, but that her illness gave Dame Carruthers an excuse to take up quarters in his house while she nursed the girl. He has spurned the old woman's obvious overtures for years. Carruthers then happens by, together with her niece Kate, and notes that the latter heard Elsie talking in her sleep about her secret wedding. The other three leave Fairfax alone, pleased to find that his mystery wife is the fair Elsie. He decides to test her loyalty by pretending to woo his own wife, still disguised as Leonard. She rejects "Leonard's" overtures, as a married woman should, and he is about to reveal himself to her.

Just then, a shot is heard from the wharf and everyone enters. Wilfred, with the jester's corroboration, declares that he struggled with someone creeping about, discovered it was Colonel Fairfax, who dived into the river, and seizing an arquebus, Wilfred shot him dead. The Lieutenant orders the Yeomen to search for the body, and Wilfred is celebrated as a hero. Elsie, Fairfax, Phoebe and Point are left alone, and Point asks Elsie, as she is now free, to marry him. Fairfax, still disguised as "Leonard", tells Point that he doesn't know how to woo (it is not to be done in the manner of a jester!), and he undertakes to instruct Point in this art, following this up with a most effective demonstration on Elsie. Point, slow to see that Fairfax is wooing the girl for himself (and that Elsie has fallen for the heroic "Leonard"), finally protests. Fairfax tells Point that he has shown him how to woo and that he should apply the teachings "elsewhere". Phoebe, seeing her adored Fairfax pledged to another, bursts into tears, while Point, shocked by the turn of events, wishes he was dead.

Wilfred sees Phoebe weeping and she, rendered incautious by anger and hurt, and by her scorn for the jailer, inadvertently reveals that "Leonard" is in fact Fairfax. Realizing the game is up, she desperately buys Wilfred's silence by agreeing to marry him (after a long engagement). The real Leonard then returns and announces that Fairfax's reprieve has finally arrived. Sergeant Meryll enters, followed surreptitiously by Dame Carruthers. Phoebe tells him of her folly and goes with Wilfred, whereupon Dame Carruthers reveals herself to Meryll and threatens to expose the three schemers who had freed Fairfax illegally. He resignedly buys her silence with his offer of marriage.

Elsie arrives joyfully for her wedding to the man she still knows as "Leonard", but the Lieutenant arrives and announces that her husband Fairfax lives. Fairfax arrives dressed for the wedding, but Elsie, distraught over the loss of "Leonard", does not turn to see his face. He teases his wife, keeping up the pretence for another minute. Elsie begs for his mercy, to free her to go to her love, "Leonard", but he says that his heart is like a "massive rock" and claims her as his bride. Finally Elsie turns to see his face, and finally recognises him as her adored one. All once again erupt into joy, except the broken-hearted Jack Point. Tearfully, he reprises the song that he had earlier sung with Elsie, The Merryman and his Maid, with wrenching sorrow. Elsie "drops a tear" for Point, but turns back to her love. As the chorus turns away to celebrate the marriage of Fairfax and Elsie, Point falls insensible at their feet.

== Musical numbers ==
Excerpts from the 1920 His Master's Voice recording of the opera, conducted by George W. Byng
Is life a boon

When our gallant Norman foes

Rapture, rapture

"Consider each person's auricular"

- Overture

Act I

- 1. "When maiden loves, she sits and sighs" (Phœbe)
- 1a. "When jealous torments rack my soul" (Wilfred) – see "Cut music"
- 2. "Tower warders, under orders" (Crowd and Yeomen, solo Second Yeoman)
- 3. "When our gallant Norman foes" (Dame Carruthers and Yeomen)
- 3a. "A laughing boy but yesterday" (Meryll); – see "Cut music"
- 4. "Alas! I waver to and fro" (Phœbe, Leonard and Meryll)
- 5. "Is life a boon?" (Fairfax)
- 6. "Here's a man of jollity" (Chorus)
- 7. "I have a song to sing, O!" (or, "The Merryman and his Maid") (Point, Elsie, and chorus)
- 8. "How say you, maiden, will you wed?" (Lieutenant, Elsie, Point)
- 9. "I've jibe and joke" (Point)
- 10. "'Tis done! I am a bride!" (Elsie)
- 11. "Were I thy bride" (Phœbe)
- 12. Finale Act I (Ensemble)
  - "Oh, Sergeant Meryll, is it true?"
  - "To thy fraternal care, thy sister I commend"
  - "The pris'ner comes to meet his doom"
  - "M'lord, m'lord.... As escort for the prisoner"
  - "All frenzied, frenzied with despair they rave"

Act II

"When a Wooer Goes A-Wooing"

- 13. "Night has spread her pall once more" (People, Dame Carruthers, Yeomen)
- 14. "Oh! a private buffoon is a light-hearted loon" (Point)
- 15. "Hereupon we're both agreed" (Point and Wilfred)
- 16. "Free from his fetters grim" (Fairfax)
- 17. "Strange adventure" (Kate, Dame Carruthers, Fairfax, Meryll)
- 18. "Hark! What was that, sir?" ... "Like a ghost his vigil keeping" (Meryll, Fairfax, Lieutenant, Wilfred, Point, Ensemble)
- 19. "A man who would woo a fair maid" (Fairfax, Elsie, Phœbe)
- 20. "When a wooer goes a-wooing" (Elsie, Fairfax, Phœbe, Point)
- 21. "Rapture, rapture" (Dame Carruthers, Sergeant Meryll)
- 22. Finale Act II (Ensemble)
  - "Comes the pretty young bride"
  - "Oh, day of terror!"
  - "Leonard, my loved one, come to me"
  - "I have a song to sing, O!"

== Cut and changed music ==
Like most of the Savoy Operas, Yeomen went through significant cuts and alterations during rehearsal, and after the authors' deaths further changes have become traditional. Much of the cut music from Yeomen survives, has been recorded, and is available for performance.

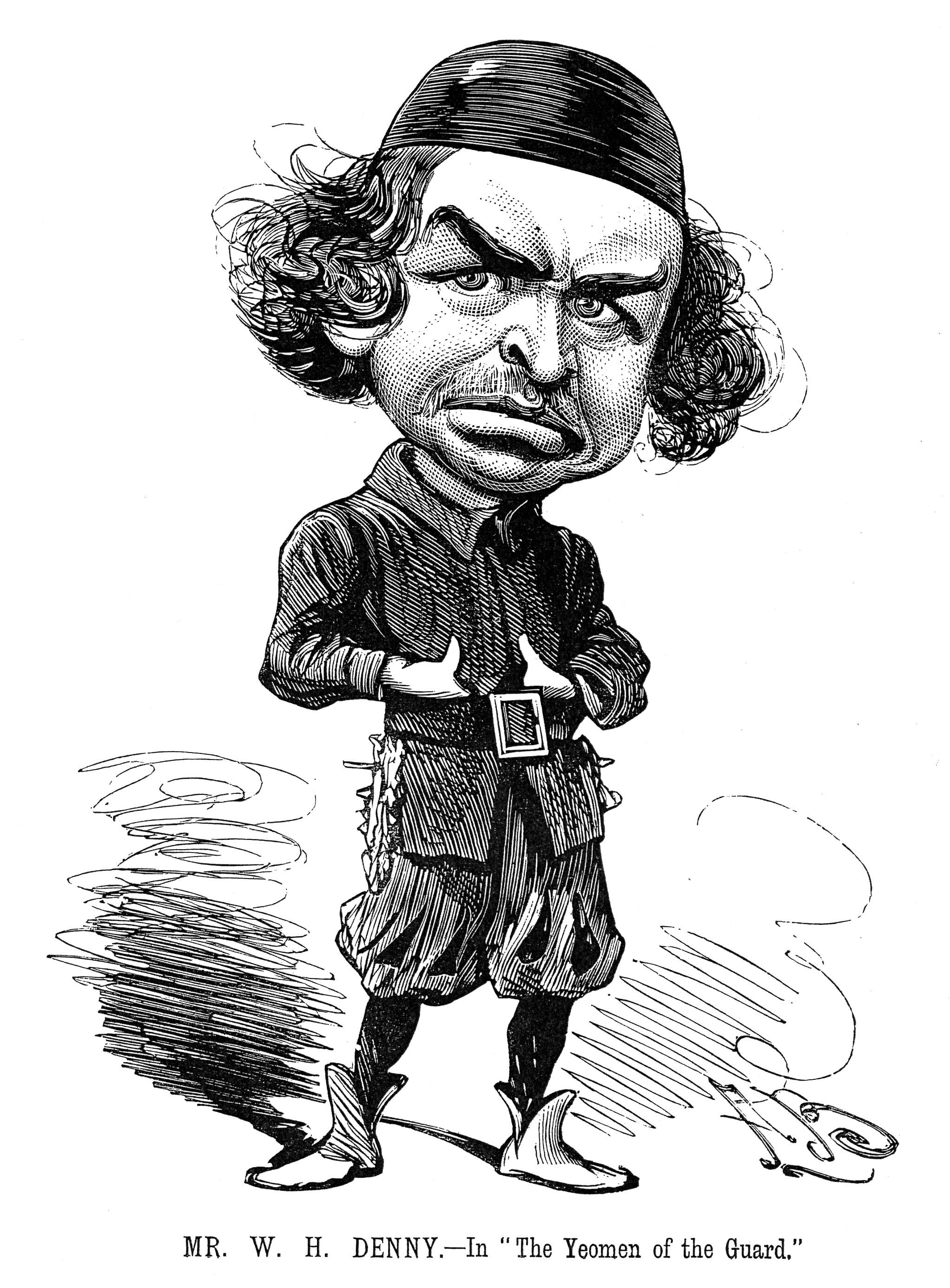
Denny as Wilfred

Wilfred's solo about his unrequited love for Phoebe, "When jealous torments rack my soul", was cut in rehearsal after Savoy Theatre favourite, Rutland Barrington, decided to withdraw from the production and take a leave from the company to try his hand as a producer and theatre manager. It was intended to be sung after Phoebe's opening solo in Act I, "When maiden loves", and the ensuing passage of dialogue between Phoebe and Wilfred. In recent decades this song has been occasionally restored in productions of the opera, including in the 1993 recording by the D'Oyly Carte Opera Company.

Just before Leonard's entrance in the first act, Sergeant Meryll originally had a nostalgic solo about his son Leonard's childhood, "A laughing boy but yesterday". This number did not please Gilbert, who called it an "introduced and wholly irrelevant song." It was sung in the first night performance but was cut thereafter. It was restored, possibly for the first time, in 1962, for a production at the Tower of London, and has been heard in a number of recordings and productions since, without becoming part of the standard score. Fairfax's first solo, "Is life a boon?", is the second version of that song. Gilbert thought that Sullivan's first setting (in 6/8 time) was too similar to many of the other tenor ballads in the Savoy Operas, and he urged the composer to rewrite it. Sullivan complied, but also saved the first version, leaving an unusual example of two separate settings of the same lyric. The revised version is invariably used in performance.

Before opening night, the third and fourth yeomen's couplets in the Act I finale – in which they remind "Leonard" of his brave deeds – were cut, though they remained in the vocal score until around the 1920s. The third yeoman had also joined Fairfax when he tells the Lieutenant that the prisoner has escaped. When the solo couplets were cut, the third yeoman was deleted from this passage as well, leaving it a trio for Fairfax and two other yeomen.

The Act II duet for Sergeant Meryll and Dame Carruthers, "Rapture, rapture", was often cut in 20th-century D'Oyly Carte Opera Company performances, apparently because it was thought to detract from the serious tone of the ending of the work. However, D'Oyly Carte eventually restored the duet, and in modern productions it is usually performed. As originally written, the duet ended with five chords leading directly into the Act II finale. Those chords do not appear in vocal scores, and modern performances usually delete them, bringing the duet to a full close so that the gentle opening bars of the finale are not covered by applause.

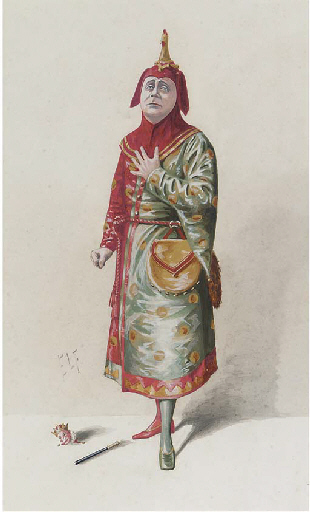
Charles H. Workman as Jack Point

At some point, before 1920 or so, the "Oh day of terror" section of the Act II finale had the parts for Kate and Phoebe significantly reduced. In the original conception, these characters echoed Elsie, with an "Oh, Leonard" solo for Kate, and cries to "Come thou to her side, and claim her as thy loving bride" sung along with Elsie. The modern version leaves Elsie singing her line by herself, puts Kate with the chorus, gives Phoebe a mixture of Dame Carruthers' part and her old one, and changes Phoebe and Dame Carruthers' lyrics. There was one other cut made after Gilbert's death: Separate lyrics for Elsie and Point, not found elsewhere, were cut during the "All frenzied, frenzied with despair they rave" section of the Act I finale.

The 1993 D'Oyly Carte recording includes all the cut music and both versions of "Is life a boon?"

== Productions ==
The Yeomen of the Guard was immediately a hit in London, with a successful New York run following shortly thereafter. Percy Anderson designed the original costumes, while the set was by Hawes Craven. The first English provincial tour opened in 1888, and from then on it was a fixture in the D'Oyly Carte repertory, with at least one official touring company playing it somewhere in almost every season until the company's closure in 1982. New costumes were designed by Anderson in 1919 and 1927, and Peter Goffin designed new sets and costumes in 1940. In Australia, the opera's first authorised performance was on 20 April 1889 at the Princess Theatre, Melbourne, produced by J. C. Williamson, which gave regular performances thereafter in Australasia until the 1960s. In 1932, Yeomen became the first Gilbert and Sullivan opera to be broadcast on the radio in its entirety.

In America in the 20th century, it was played on Broadway by various companies in 1915, 1933, 1935 and 1944, in addition to D'Oyly Carte tours, and in other New York theatres by the American Savoyards, the Light Opera of Manhattan, Bronx Opera and the New York Gilbert and Sullivan Players, among others. 21st century productions include a 2009 production at the Tower of London by the Carl Rosa Opera Company, a 2010 production by the G&S Opera Company at the International Gilbert and Sullivan Festival and then at Oxford Castle. and a 2022 staging by English National Opera.

The following table shows the history of the D'Oyly Carte productions in Gilbert's lifetime:

Theatre	Opening Date	Closing Date	Perfs.	Details
Savoy Theatre	3 October 1888	30 November 1889	423	First London run.
Casino Theatre, New York	17 October 1888	18 January 1889	100	Authorised American production.
Savoy Theatre	5 May 1897	31 July 1897	186	First London revival
Savoy Theatre	16 August 1897	20 November 1897	186	First London revival
Savoy Theatre	8 December 1906	24 August 1907	87	First Savoy repertory season; played with three other operas. (Closing date shown is of the entire season.)
Savoy Theatre	1 March 1909	27 March 1909	28	Second Savoy repertory season; played with five other operas. (Closing date shown is of the entire season.)

== Analysis of the text and music ==
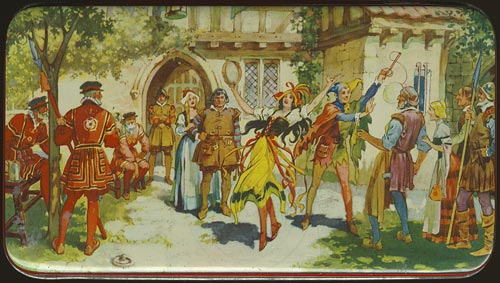
Cover of tin box, with scene from Yeomen

The opera is different from the rest of the series in a number of respects. Its tone is somewhat darker and more serious in character. There is no satire of British institutions. Instead of the opera opening with a chorus, the curtain rises on a single figure seated at a spinning-wheel singing a touching ballad. The Daily Telegraph's review of Yeomen was very admiring of Sullivan's efforts:

The accompaniments...are delightful to hear, and especially does the treatment of the woodwind compel admiring attention. Schubert himself could hardly have handled those instruments more deftly, written for them more lovingly.... We place the songs and choruses in The Yeomen of the Guard before all his previous efforts of this particular kind. Thus the music follows the book to a higher plane, and we have a genuine English opera, forerunner of many others, let us hope, and possibly significant of an advance towards a national lyric stage. (Allen, p. 312).

The Times noted, "It should ... be acknowledged that Mr. Gilbert has earnestly endeavoured to leave familiar grooves and rise to higher things." Deems Taylor later wrote that "The trouble with the book of 'The Yeomen' is that it is a grand opera story, but not grand enough; some of the lyrics, delightful as they are, sound out of mood with the plot. The score suffers from the same defect. It is serious in intent, but not weighty enough to carry the story. Altogether, the piece is a grand opera written in terms of operetta. None of which prevents many of the numbers, taken by themselves, from being among the best that Gilbert and Sullivan ever wrote." Writing in The Guardian in 2022, Michael Simkins praised the opera strongly: "Yeomen is surely their most human and richly textured work. ... [It] was not only Gilbert’s most nuanced dramaturgy, but some of Sullivan’s greatest music. Libretto and score are perfectly blended into an operetta that by turns amuses, chills and tugs at the heartstrings.

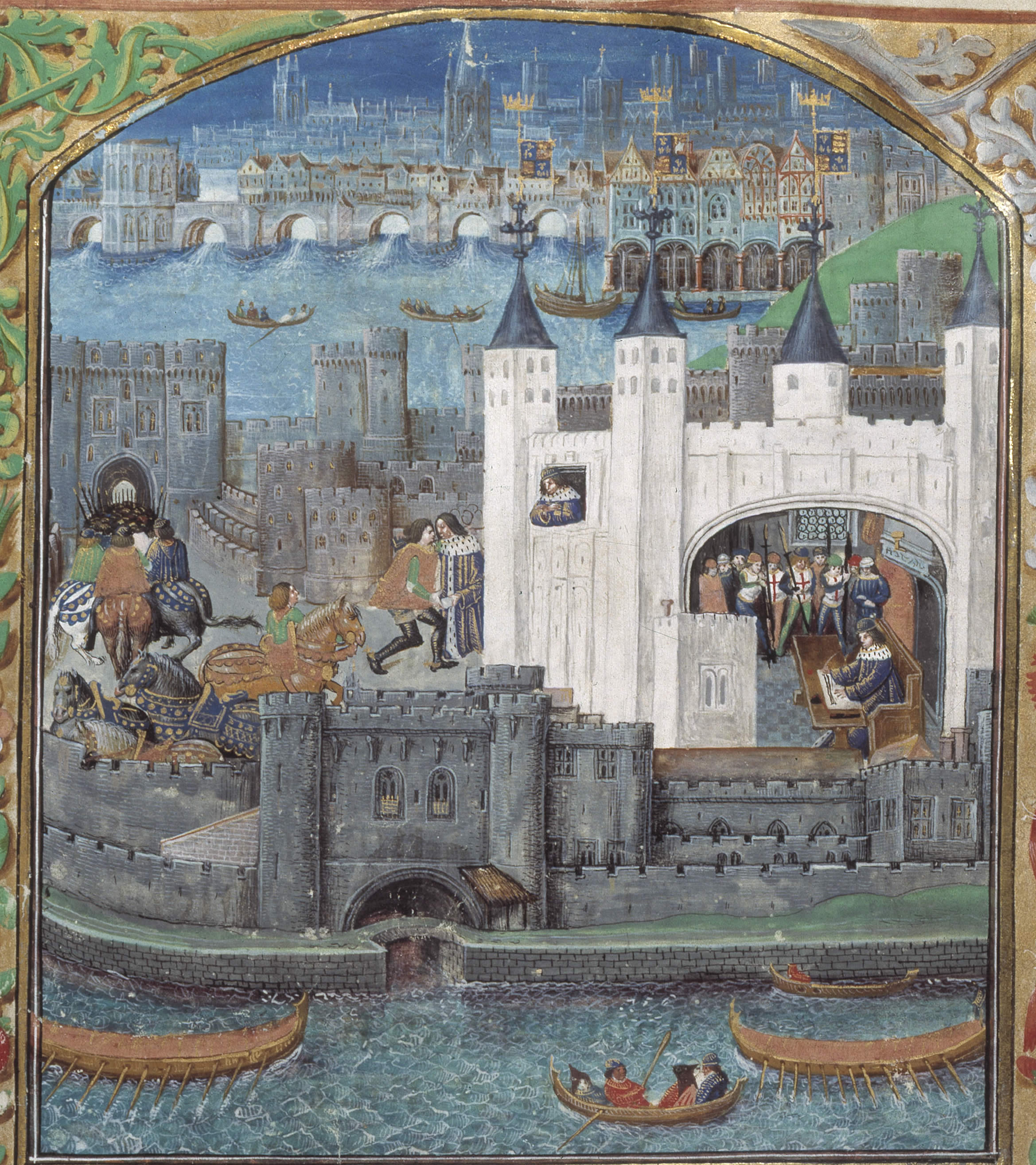
Illustration of the 15th century Tower of London

Some critics suggested that Gilbert took too much of his story from William Vincent Wallace's 1845 opera, Maritana, in which a street singer is married in secret to a gentleman. Another antecedent of Yeomen is Gilbert's 1875 tragedy, Broken Hearts. There, the love triangle among Prince Florian, Lady Vavir and the hunchbacked servant Mousta parallels the triangle in Yeomen among Fairfax, Elsie and Point.

The opera actually concerns Yeomen Warders, who are guardians of the Tower of London (and the crown jewels) and are selected for this position as a reward for long and meritorious service to the crown. Today, they act as tour guides at the Tower of London. The Yeomen Warders are often incorrectly referred to as Yeomen of the Guard, which is actually a distinct corps of royal bodyguards. Gilbert shared this confusion (or didn't care to be precise in the matter) by naming the opera The Yeomen of the Guard. However, Gilbert and Sullivan were careful to replicate the historical Tower as closely as possible in the opera's settings, costumes and music. For instance, during the Act I finale, the bell of St. Peter's tolls for the coming execution as was the custom at the time.

The character of the Lieutenant of the Tower, Sir Richard Cholmondeley, is the only character in all of the Gilbert and Sullivan operas that is based overtly on an historical figure. Cholmondeley was the Lieutenant of the Tower from 1513 to 1520, during the reign of Henry VIII. Cholmondeley lost some favour with the City of London authorities during the Evil May Day riots of 1517: He ordered the firing of some of the Tower's artillery at the city to try to quell rioting by gangs of young Londoners who took control of London for several days and were attacking foreigners, especially the wealthy foreign merchants and bankers of Lombard Street, London. Nevertheless, Cholmondeley continued serving at the Tower for three more years until ill-health forced him to resign. He was responsible for the rebuilding of the chapel of St Peter ad Vincula, the parish church of the Tower of London, where there is a prominent tomb in his memory.

== Historical casting ==
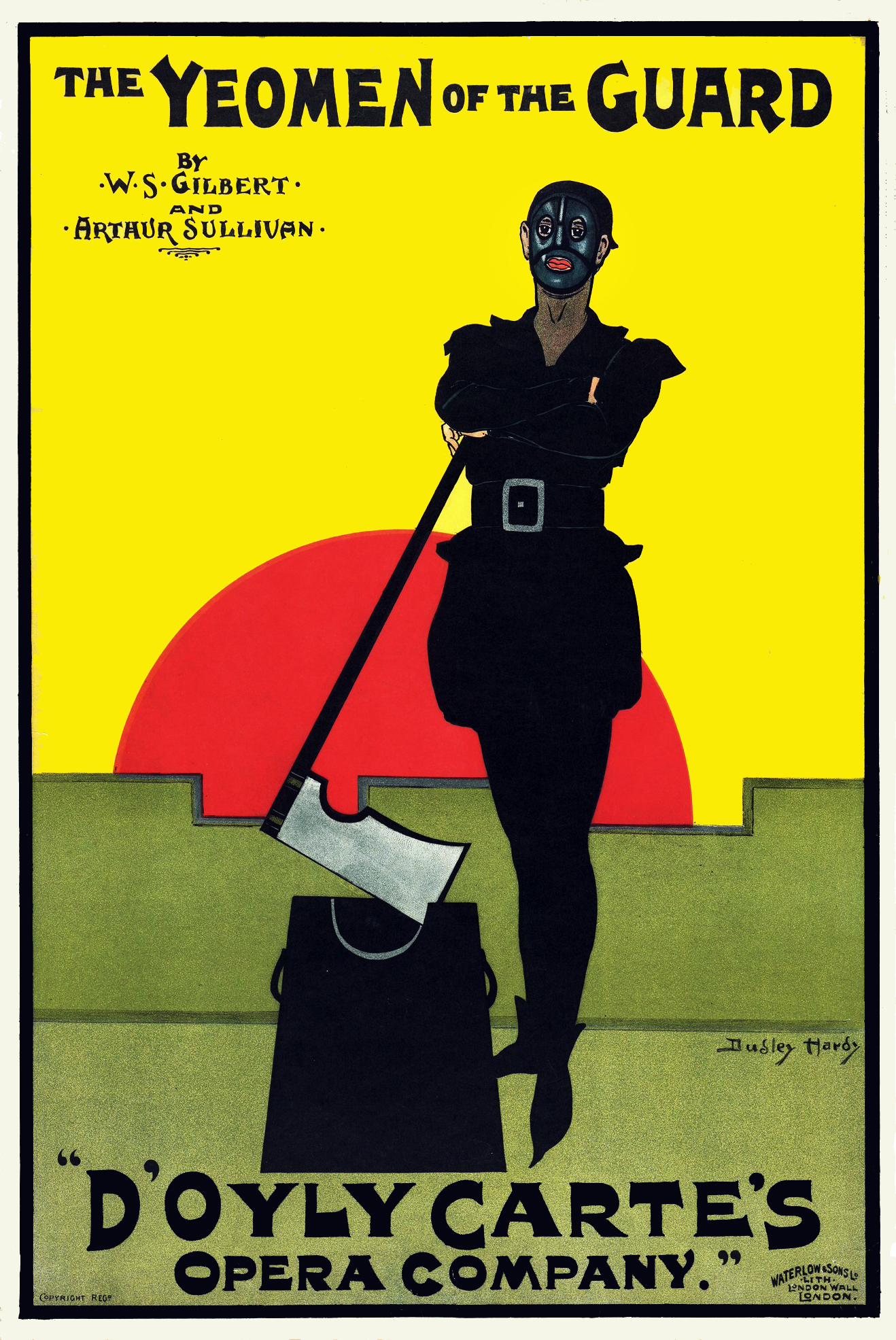
Poster for 1897 production

The following tables show the casts of the principal original productions and D'Oyly Carte Opera Company touring repertory at various times through to the company's 1982 closure. Note that the 4th Yeoman was no longer included in the cast after the original London and New York productions, and the 3rd Yeoman was no longer included after the first London revival in 1897. After the Second Repertory Season in 1909, the Headsman was no longer separately credited.

Role	Savoy Theatre 1888	Casino Theatre 1888	Savoy Theatre 1897	Savoy Theatre 1906	Savoy Theatre 1909
Lieutenant	Wallace Brownlow	George Broderick	Jones Hewson	Alec Johnstone	Leo Sheffield
Col. Fairfax	Courtice Pounds	Henry Hallam	Charles Kenningham	Pacie Ripple	Henry Herbert
Sgt. Meryll	Richard Temple	George Olmi	Richard Temple	Overton Moyle	Richard Temple
Leonard Meryll	W. R. Shirley	Charles Renwick	Scott Russell	Henry Burnand	A. Laurence Legge
Jack Point	George Grossmith	J. H. Ryley	Walter Passmore	C. H. Workman	C. H. Workman
Wilfred	W. H. Denny	Fred Solomon	Henry Lytton	John Clulow	Rutland Barrington
1st Yeoman	J. Wilbraham	Charles Thomas	Cory James	Frank Beckett	William Davidson
2nd Yeoman	A. Medcalf	J. Priest	H. G. Gordon	Leo Sheffield	Fred Hewett
3rd Yeoman	Mr. Murton	M. J. Thomas	Iago Lewys	N/A	N/A
4th Yeoman	Rudolph Lewis	L. Roach	N/A	N/A	N/A
Headsman	H. Richards	H. Adams	H. Richards	H. M. White	Richard Shaw
1st Citizen	Tom Redmond	Edgar Smith	C. H. Workman	Richard Andean	Fred G. Edgar
2nd Citizen	Mr. Boyd	Stanley Starr	Edwin Bryan	Rowland Williams	Sidney Ashcroft
Elsie	Geraldine Ulmar	Bertha Ricci	Ilka Pálmay	Lilian Coomber	Elsie Spain
Phoebe	Jessie Bond	Sylvia Gerrish	Florence Perry	Jessie Rose	Jessie Rose
Dame Carruthers	Rosina Brandram	Isabelle Urquhart	Rosina Brandram	Louie René	Louie René
Kate	Rose Hervey	Kate Uart	Ruth Vincent	Marie Wilson	Beatrice Boarer

Role	D'Oyly Carte 1920 Tour	D'Oyly Carte 1930 Tour	D'Oyly Carte 1939 Tour	D'Oyly Carte 1945 Tour	D'Oyly Carte 1950 Tour
Lieutenant	Sydney Granville	Joseph Griffin	Leslie Rands	Leslie Rands	Donald Harris
Col. Fairfax	Derek Oldham	Charles Goulding	John Dean	John Dean	Leonard Osborn
Sgt. Meryll	Darrell Fancourt	Darrell Fancourt	Darrell Fancourt	Darrell Fancourt	Darrell Fancourt
Leonard Meryll	Hugh Enes Blackmore	John Dean	Thomas Hancock	Herbert Garry	Thomas Hancock
Jack Point	Henry Lytton	Henry Lytton	Martyn Green	Grahame Clifford	Martyn Green
Wilfred	Leo Sheffield	Sydney Granville	Sydney Granville	Richard Walker	Richard Watson
1st Yeoman	James Turnbull	Herbert Aitken	Leonard Osborn	Rhys Thomas	Frederick Sinden
2nd Yeoman	Henry Blain	Richard Eaton	Hugh Rowlands	Hilton Layland	Eric Thornton
1st Citizen	Allen Morris	C. William Morgan	C. William Morgan	C. William Morgan	Roy Roser
2nd Citizen	Harry Arnold	T. Penry Hughes	Richard Walker	Wynn Dyson	Peter Pratt
Elsie	Sylvia Cecil	Winifred Lawson	Helen Roberts	Helen Roberts	Muriel Harding
Phoebe	Catherine Ferguson	Marjorie Eyre	Marjorie Eyre	Marjorie Eyre	Joan Gillingham
Dame Carruthers	Bertha Lewis	Bertha Lewis	Evelyn Gardiner	Ella Halman	Ella Halman
Kate	Elsie Griffin	Muriel Davies	Margery Abbott	Margaret Mitchell	Deidree Thurlow

Role	D'Oyly Carte 1958 Tour	D'Oyly Carte 1965 Tour	D'Oyly Carte 1975 Tour	D'Oyly Carte 1982 Tour
Lieutenant	Alan Styler	Alan Styler	John Broad	Clive Harre
Col. Fairfax	Leonard Osborn	Philip Potter	Colin Wright	Geoffrey Shovelton
Sgt. Meryll	Donald Adams	Donald Adams	John Ayldon	John Ayldon
Leonard Meryll	Frederick Sinden	David Palmer	Jeffrey Cresswell	Meston Reid
Jack Point	Peter Pratt	John Reed	John Reed	James Conroy-Ward
Wilfred	Kenneth Sandford	Kenneth Sandford	Kenneth Sandford	Kenneth Sandford
1st Yeoman	John Fryatt	Glyn Adams	Barry Clark	Barry Clark
2nd Yeoman	John Banks	Anthony Raffell	Gareth Jones	Thomas Scholey
1st Citizen	Glyn Adams	Jon Ellison	James Conroy-Ward	Clive Birch
2nd Citizen	John Reed	Alfred Oldridge	Jon Ellison	Alistair Donkin
Elsie	Jean Hindmarsh	Ann Hood	Pamela Field	Barbara Lilley
Phoebe	Joyce Wright	Peggy Ann Jones	Judi Merri	Lorraine Daniels
Dame Carruthers	Ann Drummond-Grant	Christene Palmer	Lyndsie Holland	Patricia Leonard
Kate	Jennifer Toye	Jennifer Marks	Anne Egglestone	Jane Stanford

== Recordings ==
I have a song to sing, O!
"I have a song to sing, O!" sung by George Baker (Jack Point) and Violet Essex (Elsie Maynard), 1920

Many recordings have been made of this opera. Of those recorded by the D'Oyly Carte Opera Company, the 1950 and 1964 recordings are well regarded. The 1993 "New" D'Oyly Carte recording includes all of the "cut" material. Marriner's recording from the same year contains some of the dialogue and is considered strong. The 1995 Mackerras recording is also admired. The 1982 Brent Walker video suffers from a number of important cuts and Joel Grey's much-criticised portrayal of Jack Point. More recent professional productions have been recorded on video by the International Gilbert and Sullivan Festival.

Selected recordings

- 1928 D'Oyly Carte – Conductor: Malcolm Sargent
- 1950 D'Oyly Carte – Conductor: Isidore Godfrey
- 1958 Sargent/Glyndebourne – Pro Arte Orchestra, Glyndebourne Festival Chorus, Conductor: Sir Malcolm Sargent
- 1964 D'Oyly Carte – Royal Philharmonic Orchestra, Conductor: Sir Malcolm Sargent
- 1979 D'Oyly Carte – Royal Philharmonic Orchestra, Conductor: Royston Nash
- 1982 Brent Walker Productions (video) – Ambrosian Opera Chorus, London Symphony Orchestra, Conductor: Alexander Faris; Stage Director: Anthony Besch
- 1993 Marriner/Philips (with abr. dialogue) – Academy and Chorus of St Martin in the Fields, Conductor: Sir Neville Marriner
- 1993 New D'Oyly Carte – Conductor: John Owen Edwards
- 1995 Mackerras/Telarc – Orchestra & Chorus of the Welsh National Opera, Conductor: Sir Charles Mackerras

== Legacy, adaptations and cultural influence ==
A monument in Sullivan's memory was erected in the Victoria Embankment Gardens (London) and is inscribed with a lyric, chosen by Gilbert, from Yeomen: "Is life a boon? If so, it must befall that Death, whene'er he call, must call too soon". In 1962, 1964, 1966, 1978 and 2009, the opera was staged before large audiences in the moat of the Tower of London. The 1978 production, starring Tommy Steele was filmed for ATV.

A 1957 American TV broadcast of the opera as part of the NBC Hallmark Hall of Fame series starred Alfred Drake as Point, Barbara Cook as Elsie, Celeste Holm as Phoebe and Bill Hayes as Fairfax, and featured Henry Calvin as Wilfred and Marjorie Gordon as Kate, with announcer Lee Vines. It was broadcast on 10 April 1957 and was directed by George Schaefer and conducted by Franz Allers. It is 79 minutes long, including commercials, so much of the dialogue and some music is cut. Alfred Drake narrates the story. A black and white kinescope recording of the broadcast has been released on DVD.

The Australian Broadcasting Commission made a TV version in 1972 starring Alan Lander and Pamela Stephenson. A 1975 TV version by the BBC stars Valerie Masterson as Elsie, Derek Hammond-Stroud as Point, David Hillman as Fairfax, Bryan Drake as Sgt. Meryll, Richard Angas as Sir Richard and Elizabeth Bainbridge as Carruthers. It was directed by John Gorrie and conducted by David Lloyd-Jones. Another cut version was made in 1978 for British TV starring Tommy Steele as Point, Terry Jenkins as Fairfax, Anne Collins as Carruthers, Laureen Livingstone as Elsie, Della Jones as Phoebe, Paul Hudson as Meryll and Dennis Wicks as Wilfred. It was directed by Anthony Besch and conducted by David Lloyd-Jones in connection with 1978 City of London Festival.

The musical group Peter, Paul and Mary included the song, "I have a song to sing, O!" on one of their children's albums, Peter, Paul and Mommy (1969). In 1973, an episode of the BBC's Play for Today television series, Jack Point, by Colin Welland, directed by Michael Apted, concerned the tensions in an amateur theatre group during a production of Yeomen, particularly the casting of the part of Jack Point. Perish in July, a 1989 novel by Mollie Hardwick, part of her Doran Fairweather series, involves a backstage murder of the actress playing Elsie.
