= John Dean (tenor) =

British opera singer and actor (1897–1990)

John Dean (2 September 1897 – 20 March 1990) was an English singer and actor, best known for his performances in the tenor roles of the Savoy Operas with the D'Oyly Carte Opera Company.

== Life and career ==
John Dean was born in Lilleshall, Shropshire, England. He joined a D'Oyly Carte touring company in 1926. The next year, he took his first role, First Yeoman in The Yeomen of the Guard. He also made occasional appearances as Leonard Meryll in Yeomen. In 1928, he began to play the roles of the Defendant in Trial by Jury and Francesco in The Gondoliers. In 1929, Dean took over the role of Leonard Meryll and switched to the larger role of Luiz in The Gondoliers.

In 1930, Dean added the roles of Mr. Box in Cox and Box, Earl Tolloller in Iolanthe, Cyril in Princess Ida and Nanki-Poo in The Mikado. Over the next fifteen years, he continued to play the principal tenor parts, although he had to yield some of them to Derek Oldham when he returned to the company, from time to time, until 1936. Other roles included Alexis in The Sorcerer, Ralph Rackstraw in H.M.S. Pinafore Frederic in The Pirates of Penzance, the Duke of Dunstable in Patience, Richard Dauntless in Ruddigore, Colonel Fairfax in Yeomen, and Marco in The Gondoliers. Dean appeared in several radio broadcasts with D'Oyly Carte from 1932 to 1935. Dean performed many of his roles in D'Oyly Carte's American tours in 1934, 1936 and 1939.

Dean left the D'Oyly Carte organisation in 1946 and was replaced by the returning Leonard Osborn and Thomas Round. After leaving the company, he travelled to Australia with several other former members of the D'Oyly Carte Opera Company. He appeared in The Gondoliers in Australia in 1949 with the J. C. Williamson Gilbert and Sullivan Opera Company. In 1975, during the D'Oyly Carte Opera Company's centennial season, Dean was invited to participate in the final performance of Trial by Jury, in which the company's regular chorus was augmented by fourteen former stars of the company.

Dean died in Thornton-le-Dale, Yorkshire. He was known, among his D'Oyly Carte colleagues, as a good storyteller.

== See also ==
- J. C. Williamson
