= Leonard Osborn =

British opera singer, actor and stage director

Osborn (centre) with John Reed (l) and Ivor Evans in Patience

Leonard Osborn (11 November 1914 – 28 September 1994) was an English opera singer and actor, best known for his portrayal of the tenor roles in the Savoy Operas with the D'Oyly Carte Opera Company. An accomplished actor and dancer, he later became a stage director for the company.

== Life and career ==
Leonard Alfred George Osborn was born in Tooting, London, England. He performed in amateur Gilbert and Sullivan productions and worked as a chemist before joining D'Oyly Carte as a tenor chorister in 1937 (the company was paying choristers more than his old job). During his first season with the company, he was given the small role of First Yeoman (and, occasionally played the slightly larger role of Leonard Meryll) in The Yeomen of the Guard. In 1938, he added the roles of the Defendant in Trial by Jury and Francesco in The Gondoliers. He also substituted as Earl Tolloller in Iolanthe in 1939. In 1940, he continued to play the Defendant and chorus roles.

He joined the Royal Air Force in July 1940, where he sang in many military concerts. In 1946, after the end of World War II, he rejoined D'Oyly Carte as principal tenor, immediately playing Tolloller and Nanki-Poo in The Mikado. From 1946 to 1959, he regularly played the roles of the Defendant, the Duke of Dunstable in Patience, Tolloller, Colonel Fairfax in The Yeomen of the Guard, Marco in The Gondoliers, Mr. Box in Cox and Box, Richard Dauntless in Ruddigore (his favourite role), and, from 1954, Cyril in Princess Ida. Reviewing Iolanthe in 1951, The Times wrote, "Mr. Leonard Osborn's tenor voice has a ring and a line that did justice to 'Blue Blood'." The Gramophone called Osborn "one of the most melodious Ralph Rackstraws that the D'Oyly Carte Company have ever produced … finely characterised, beautifully enunciated and with some ringing top notes."

Osborn left the D'Oyly Carte company in November 1959 to enter the retail business in Surrey, occasionally directing amateur productions. In 1975, during the company's centennial season, Osborn was invited to participate in the final performance of Trial by Jury, in which the regular D'Oyly Carte chorus was augmented by fourteen former stars of the company.

In 1977 he rejoined the company as stage director for Princess Ida for the Sadler's Wells special Jubilee season. In September of that year, Queen Elizabeth II's Jubilee Year, the company gave a Royal Command Performance at Windsor Castle, directed by Osborn. He served as a production director for the D'Oyly Carte Opera Company until 1980.

Osborn died in London at the age of 79.

== Recordings ==
Osborn sang in all but one of Decca's eleven D'Oyly Carte recordings made between 1949 and 1955. His recorded roles were the Defendant in Trial by Jury (1949), Ralph Rackstraw in H.M.S. Pinafore (1949), Frederic in The Pirates of Penzance (1950), Nanki-Poo in The Mikado (1950), Marco in The Gondoliers (1950), Richard Dauntless in Ruddigore (1951), Fairfax in The Yeomen of the Guard (1951), Tolloller in Iolanthe (1952), the Duke in Patience (part only) (Note: In the Patience recording Osborn sings the Duke's first solo, and for the rest of the score Neville Griffiths takes the role. Osborn became unwell while the recording was being made and Griffiths, the company's other principal tenor, took over at short notice.) (1952), and Cyril in Princess Ida (1955).

== Notes, references and sources ==
=== Sources ===
- Joseph, Tony (2007). Leonard Osborn: "Dauntless he...". Bristol: Bunthorne Books. ISBN 978-0-9507992-8-5.
- Rollins, Cyril; R. John Witts (1962). The D'Oyly Carte Opera Company in Gilbert and Sullivan Operas: A Record of Productions, 1875–1961. London: Michael Joseph. OCLC 504581419.
