= Mary Sansom =

English singer and actress (1935–2010)

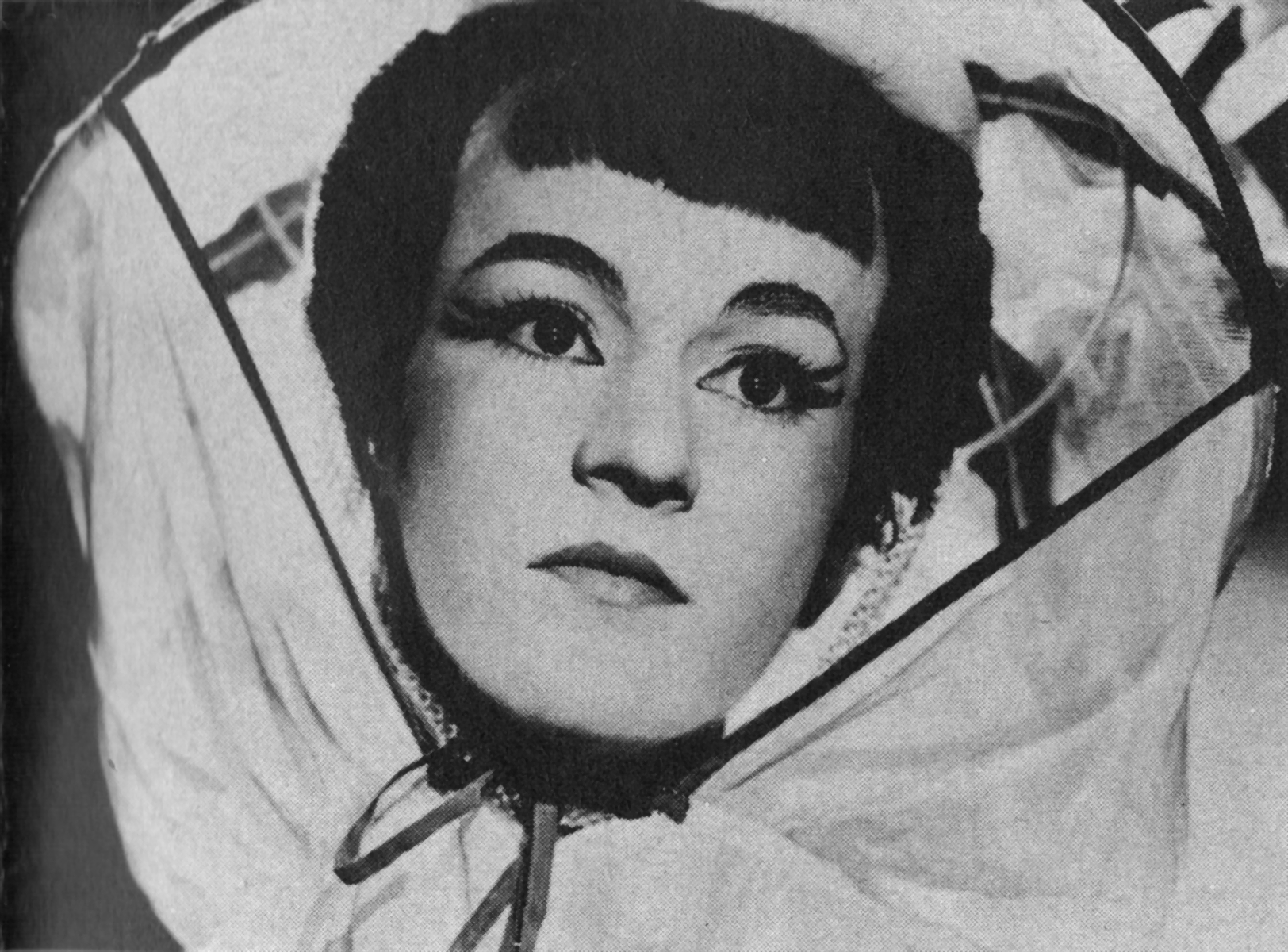
Sansom as Yum-Yum in The Mikado

Mary Sansom (26 May 1935 – 13 April 2010) was an English operatic soprano best known for her performances in principal soprano roles with the D'Oyly Carte Opera Company in the 1950s and 1960s, including as Yum-Yum in The Mikado, Josephine in H.M.S. Pinafore, Phyllis in Iolanthe, the title role in Patience and Gianetta in The Gondoliers. In later years, she performed with Gilbert and Sullivan for All, directed stage productions and established a costume hire business. She also appeared in supporting roles on British television.

== Early life and career ==
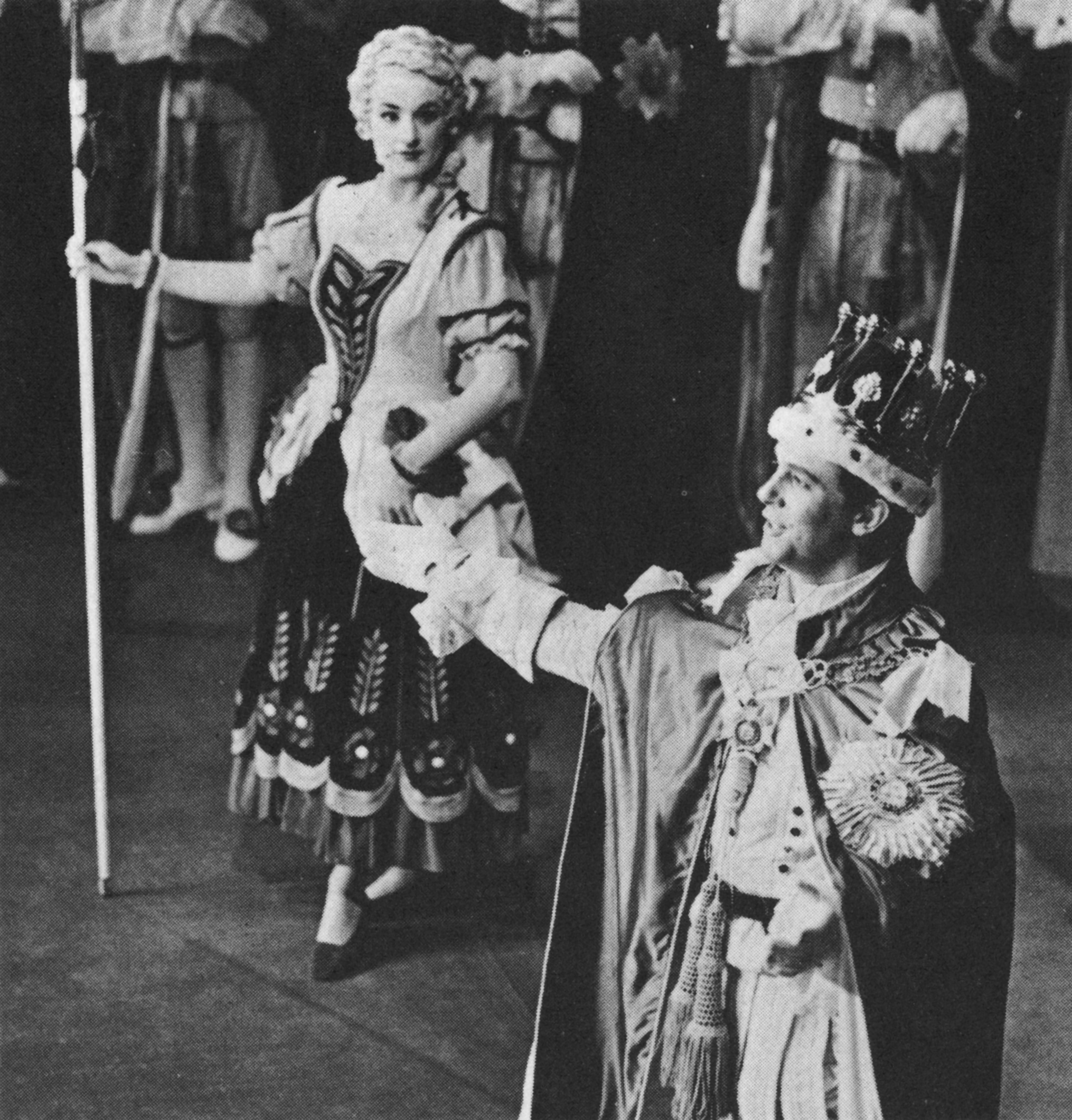
Sansom as Phyllis in Iolanthe with Philip Potter as Earl Tolloller

Sansom was born in Taunton, Somerset, on 26 May 1935. She was educated at Bishop Fox's School, Taunton, and studied in Bristol with the voice teacher Elsie Blakeborough. As a young singer Sansom won awards at the Bristol Eisteddfod and joined the local amateur operatic society, quickly graduating to leading soprano roles. She auditioned for Bridget D'Oyly Carte and joined the D'Oyly Carte Opera Company in May 1956. She began her career with the company singing in the chorus and the small parts of Celia in Iolanthe, Zorah in Ruddigore and Fiametta in The Gondoliers. She served as understudy to Jean Hindmarsh for roles including Mabel in The Pirates of Penzance, Josephine in H.M.S. Pinafore, Lady Ella in Patience, Elsie Maynard in The Yeomen of the Guard and Gianetta in The Gondoliers.

In April 1957 Sansom married Alan Barrett, a baritone who also performed with D'Oyly Carte. They performed together in principal roles on only one occasion, when John Reed was unwell and Barratt played the Learned Judge in Trial by Jury with Sansom as the Plaintiff.

== Principal roles and later years ==
In August 1959 Sansom was promoted to regular principal soprano in the roles of Yum-Yum in The Mikado, Phyllis in Iolanthe, Rose Maybud in Ruddigore and Lady Ella in Patience. From May 1960 she moved up to the title role in Patience, when Hindmarsh left the company. In September 1961 she handed over the role of Yum-Yum to Jennifer Toye and in November of that year took on Lady Psyche in Princess Ida and Elsie Maynard in The Yeomen of the Guard. In 1962–63, Sansom appeared as Phyllis, Psyche and Elsie all season, and played the Plaintiff in Trial by Jury, Edith in Pirates and Fiametta in The Gondoliers for the first half of the season and Josephine in H.M.S. Pinafore and Gianetta in The Gondoliers starting in January 1963. She gave up Josephine and Elsie during the 1963–64 season, before leaving D'Oyly Carte in July 1964 to start a family. She and Barrett had two children.

After leaving D'Oyly Carte, Sansom sang from time to time with Thomas Round and others in the Gilbert and Sullivan for All company. She turned to directing and staged her first amateur production, Princess Ida, in 1973. Over the next twenty-five years she directed not only Savoy Operas but also grand opera, operetta, musicals and pantomimes. For one of these productions she made head-dresses and medieval banners. This led to the establishment by Sansom and her husband of Barretts of Bath, a firm providing costumes for hire to amateur operatic societies. The couple ran the company for 25 years. From time to time Sansom appeared in supporting roles on British television, in series including Casualty, The House of Eliott and The Mayor of Casterbridge. In retirement she devoted herself to voluntary work at Bath Abbey.

Sansom died in Bath on 13 April 2010, aged 74 after suffering from Alzheimer's disease.

== Recordings ==
Sansom was praised by The Times for the purity of her voice, which, together with her "directness of approach" was considered her most distinguishing feature. She sang on D'Oyly Carte's 1960 Iolanthe as Phyllis, 1961 Gondoliers as Gianetta, 1961 Patience as the title character and 1962 Ruddigore as Zorah.

== Sources ==
- Rollins, Cyril; R. John Witts (1962). The D'Oyly Carte Opera Company in Gilbert and Sullivan Operas: A Record of Productions, 1875–1961. London: Michael Joseph. OCLC 504581419. With four supplements, privately printed.
