= Thomas Round =

English opera singer (1915–2016)

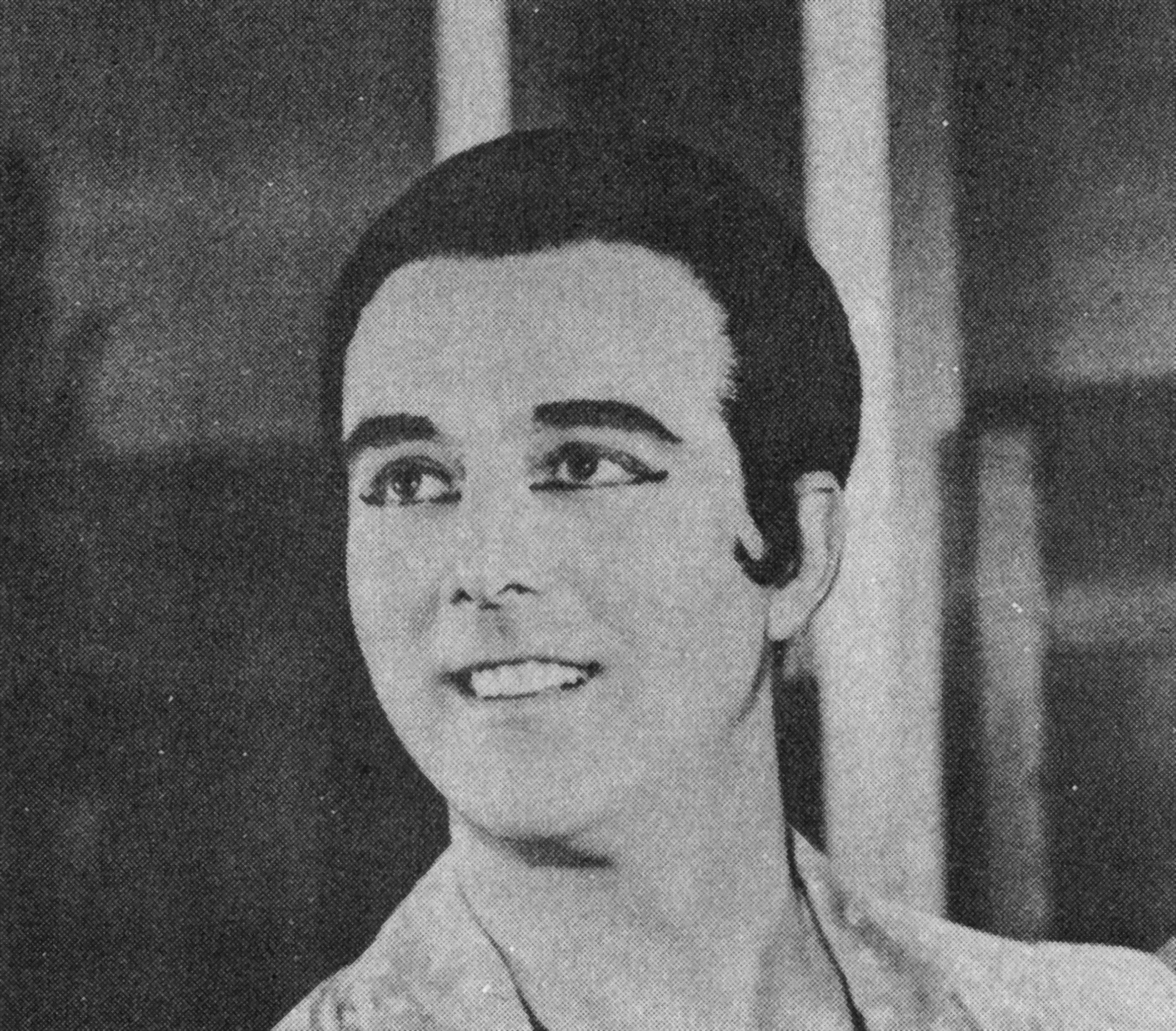
Round as Nanki-Poo in The Mikado

Thomas Round (18 October 1915 – 2 October 2016) was an English opera singer and actor, best known for his performances in the leading tenor roles of the Savoy Operas and grand opera.

Round began working as a joiner and then a police officer. During World War II, he served in the Royal Air Force, training in Texas and later becoming a flight instructor for the United States Army Air Forces, while singing in churches. He sang leading tenor roles in the Gilbert and Sullivan operas for the D'Oyly Carte Opera Company from 1946 to 1949. He next spent six years in the 1950s singing opera and operetta with Sadler's Wells Opera. From 1958 to 1964, Round again performed mostly with the D'Oyly Carte company. In 1963, he co-founded a new ensemble, Gilbert and Sullivan for All, with which he toured extensively over the next two decades, singing and serving as one of the company's directors. He also sang in oratorio and concerts, broadcast on radio and television, and is heard on many recordings. Round continued to perform and lecture into his 90s.

== Life and career ==
=== Early life and military service ===
Round was born and raised in Barrow-in-Furness, Lancashire (now in Cumbria). He was the third of four children of a furnace man at a steel mill. Round began singing as a child in the St Paul's Mission church choir, where he met his future wife, Alice York. On leaving Barrow Technical College at the age of 15, he started working at the mill as an apprentice joiner and competed at some music festivals. In 1936 he joined the police force and was stationed in Lancaster. He found his duties generally dull, although he was posted to guard the house where Dr Buck Ruxton had notoriously killed his wife and housemaid the previous year. During this time, he enjoyed performing with local musical societies. In 1938 he married Alice at St Paul's Church, Barrow, and the couple had one son, Ellis, born in 1942, who became an aeronautical engineer.

During World War II, Round became a fighter pilot in the Royal Air Force and was posted to Canada and then the No. 1 British Flying Training School in Terrell, Texas, serving as a flying instructor for the United States Air Force. He then began his performing career, later recalling, "I was doing a lot of singing every Sunday in churches all over Texas. I had my own plane so I would fly down 300 miles to San Antonio for an 11 a.m. service, I would sing and then I would fly back home in the evening." He also performed on the radio and was offered the chance to appear as a guest in a college production in Dallas, playing Canio in Pagliacci. "It was my first time in any type of production but I loved it." Round was offered a place at a music school in New York, but turned it down to return home to England in 1943.

=== D'Oyly Carte and Sadler's Wells years ===
While still in the RAF, Round auditioned for the D'Oyly Carte Opera Company and joined it upon his discharge, in February 1946. He understudied the leading Gilbert and Sullivan tenor roles, appearing occasionally as Nanki-Poo in The Mikado. In September of the same year, he became the company's principal tenor, for the next three years, playing the roles of Ralph Rackstraw in H.M.S. Pinafore, Frederic in The Pirates of Penzance, Earl Tolloller in Iolanthe, Nanki-Poo in The Mikado, and Luiz in The Gondoliers.

Round found the D'Oyly Carte touring schedule gruelling and left the company in 1949. He appeared in Emile Littler's musical Waltzes from Vienna, playing the young Johann Strauss, and two ice shows, Rose Marie on Ice (1950) and the London Melody. Next, he sang for six years with Sadler's Wells Opera. He appeared in some comic character parts such as Don Basilio in The Marriage of Figaro, but generally took the leading romantic tenor roles, including Tamino in The Magic Flute, Jeník in The Bartered Bride, and Don Ottavio in Don Giovanni. He played roles in Gianni Schicchi, Lilac Time, Eugene Onegin, and less-frequently staged works including Rimsky Korsakov's The Snow Maiden (Tsar Berendei), Wolf-Ferrari's School for Fathers (Count Riccardo), and John Gardner's adaptation of The Moon and Sixpence.

During his Sadler's Wells years, Round undertook guest engagements elsewhere. He created the tenor lead, Nils, in the world premiere of Delius's Irmelin under Sir Thomas Beecham in Oxford in 1953. The critic Eric Blom wrote, "Thomas Round as the hero was particularly good. He should soon make a Siegfried, though perhaps only the young Siegfried to begin with." Also in 1953, he appeared in the film The Story of Gilbert and Sullivan. The following year, he rejoined D'Oyly Carte as a guest artist for a short period, playing Prince Hilarion in a new production of Princess Ida at the Savoy Theatre. In 1955 he and the young Heather Harper played the leads in a televised version of La traviata, which was the first full-length opera ever shown on BBC television. In 1958, he participated in the Royal Variety Performance. Round sang Don Luis in the zarzuela El barberillo de Lavapiés (The Little Barber of Lavapiés, in a version by Geoffrey Dunn) for a BBC radio broadcast in 1954.

Round returned to D'Oyly Carte, on tour in 1958 in Dublin, playing his old roles of Frederic, Nanki-Poo, adding Ralph, and, for the first time, Marco in The Gondoliers, the following season. During the company's summer break in 1958, Round earned more good notices as Count Danilo opposite June Bronhill with Sadler's Wells in The Merry Widow at the London Coliseum. The Musical Times found him "dashingly stylish". The production was made into the first film by a major British opera company of The Merry Widow (1958). The same year, he appeared in the Royal Variety Performance. He also played principal roles in Pagliacci, In 1960 and 1961 he assumed a new role, Colonel Fairfax, in The Yeomen of the Guard, also appearing in that role for the City of London Festival production at the Tower of London in 1962. In 1961, his other new roles were Richard Dauntless in Ruddigore and Cyril in Princess Ida, and he participated in 1962–63 in the company's extensive North American tour. By 1963, Philip Potter had taken over the parts of Frederic and Nanki-Poo, but Round added the role of the Defendant in Trial by Jury and resumed singing Tolloller in Iolanthe. In 1964, he again left the D'Oyly Carte company. He told The Times, "For the first time in my career I am not under contract to anyone, and I find this quite exciting." Round built up a popular following particularly among female members of the D'Oyly Carte and Sadler's Wells audiences.

=== Gilbert and Sullivan for All ===
In 1963, Round, together with Norman Meadmore and Donald Adams, founded their own ensemble, Gilbert and Sullivan for All. In 1969, when Adams left D'Oyly Carte, the partners began to tour extensively with this new company in the British Isles, the Far East, Australasia, and North America, including three Hollywood Bowl concerts with the Los Angeles Philharmonic. To enable the company to appear in small venues, Sullivan's orchestrations were adapted and arranged for smaller forces than D'Oyly Carte employed. Other regular members of the ensemble were Valerie Masterson and Gillian Knight. Round sang the roles of Box in Cox and Box, the Defendant in Trial, Ralph in H.M.S. Pinafore, Frederic in Pirates, Tolloller in Iolanthe, Nanki-Poo in The Mikado, Richard Dauntless in Ruddigore, Colonel Fairfax in Yeomen, and Marco in The Gondoliers, as well as acting as a director for the company. Gilbert and Sullivan for All wound down in the 1980s, but Round and Adams continued to appear in Gilbert and Sullivan together into the 1990s.

During his Gilbert and Sullivan for All years, Round also appeared as Arthur Sullivan on tour with Donald Adams in Tarantara! Tarantara!, a musical about the Gilbert and Sullivan partnership by Ian Taylor. Among other non-Gilbert and Sullivan appearances in the 1960s, Round played Henry Higgins in My Fair Lady. In the 1970s, Round and Adams presented a television series about the Savoy operas, devoting each programme to an individual opera.

=== Later years and retirement ===
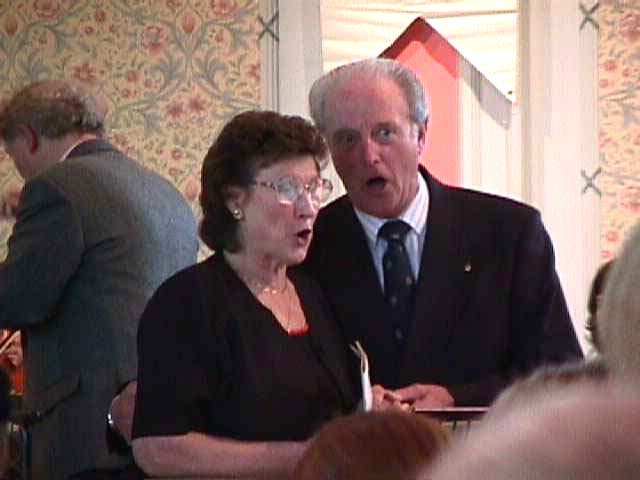
Round with Jean Hindmarsh at the International Gilbert and Sullivan Festival in 1998

Throughout his career, Round continued to give concerts and to sing in oratorio and recitals. He was frequently heard on BBC radio, including the Friday Night Is Music Night programme, and his television performances included several operas, listed in the filmography below. In November 1995, he celebrated fifty years as a professional singer with a three-day opera event in the Lake District at which Adams also appeared.

In 1980, Round took up sailing as a hobby, together with his son Ellis, and in 1988, he and his wife moved from London to Bolton-le-Sands on the Lancashire coast, where he enjoyed sailing on Windermere. Round maintained his interest in Gilbert and Sullivan and their works and served as president of the Marton Operatic Society and vice-president of The Gilbert and Sullivan Society (London). Until 2006, Round was also honorary president of the University of York Gilbert and Sullivan Society. In 2006, he became the president of Lancaster & District Choral Society, serving until 2015. He also appeared many times at the annual International Gilbert and Sullivan Festival performing, lecturing and meeting with Gilbert and Sullivan enthusiasts well into his 90s. He published a biography in 2002. Round's wife Alice died in 2010; the couple were married for 72 years.

Round died at age 100, on 2 October 2016.

== Recordings and filmography ==
In 1958, Bronhill and Round recorded The Merry Widow for HMV and were filmed. The Gramophone described his Danilo as "first class ... with a fresh youthful voice and an easy and appropriately racy style." This was followed by Lilac Time released in 1960.

With the D'Oyly Carte Opera Company and Decca Records, Round recorded Hilarion (1955), Frederic (1958), Nanki-Poo (1958), Ralph Rackstraw (1960), Tolloller (1960), Marco (1961), Richard Dauntless (1962), the Defendant (1964), and Captain Fitzbattleaxe in Utopia, Limited (1964 excerpts). In 2008 the critic of The Gramophone, John Steane, wrote that, of Gilbert and Sullivan tenors, Round was "surely the best we've had."

In the 1970s, Round also recorded and filmed his roles with Gilbert and Sullivan for All. These were complete recordings of Trial by Jury and Cox and Box, and excerpts (as much as would fit on two sides of an LP record) of seven others, which have since been reissued on CD. In 1996, when the Gilbert and Sullivan for All films were reissued on video by the International Gilbert and Sullivan Festival, Round recorded introductions for each. The Gilbert and Sullivan for All team also recorded a miscellaneous LP, including Valerie Masterson and Gillian Knight as Princesses Nekaya and Kalyba in an excerpt from Utopia, Limited, and Round as Antonio in The Gondoliers. With Donald Adams, he recorded a musical documentary, The Story of Gilbert & Sullivan, written by Dr. Thomas Heric. He also took part in two recordings of lesser-known Sullivan music with numbers from The Rose of Persia, Ivanhoe, and a 6/8 alternative of "Is life a boon?".

For Pearl Records, Round recorded a collection of Victorian ballads, which was chosen by The Times as one of the "Critics' choice, records of the year" for 1974, an eclectic collection, Songs You Love (1976), and he participated in a recording of Edwardian music. In 2008, he released a CD of twelve Irish songs called Thomas Round sings Irish Songs, recorded when he was principal tenor with Sadler's Wells Opera.

Round's filmography is as follows:

- 1953 : The Story of Gilbert and Sullivan: Defendant in Trial by Jury
- 1955 : La traviata (TV): Armand
- 1955 : The Bartered Bride (TV): Jeník
- 1958 : The Merry Widow (TV): Count Danilo Danilovitch
- 1972 : The Yeomen of the Guard (TV): Col. Fairfax and 1996 video presenter
- 1972 : Trial by Jury (TV): The Defendant and 1997 Video Presenter
- 1972 : Ruddigore (TV): Richard Dauntless and 1997 Video Presenter
- 1972 : The Pirates of Penzance (TV): Frederic and 1996 Video Presenter
- 1972 : The Mikado (TV): Nanki-Poo and Video Presenter 1997
- 1972 : Iolanthe (TV): Earl Tolloller and 1997 Video Presenter
- 1972 : H.M.S. Pinafore (TV): Ralph Rackstraw and 1996 Video Presenter
- 1972 : The Gondoliers (TV): Marco Palmieri and Video Presenter
- 2000 : Trial by Jury (TV): The Defendant
- 2000 : Together Again: A Tribute to Kenneth Sandford, John Reed, and Thomas Round (video). Round acted as a presenter and performed excerpts of the following roles: Richard Dauntless, Nanki-Poo, Tolloller, Count Danilo, Marco.
