= Helen Landis =

Helen Landis, c. 1950s

Helen Landis (20 March 1923 – 22 March 2015) was an English singer and actress, known for her performances in musical theatre, operetta and opera, especially roles in early British productions of Rodgers and Hammerstein's and Ivor Novello's musicals and the contralto roles in the Savoy operas with the Gilbert and Sullivan for All company, with whom she toured extensively for more than 20 years.

== Life and career ==
Landis was born in Bolton, Lancashire. She began her career with the Carl Rosa Opera Company, singing mezzo-soprano roles with them for three years. She then appeared in operetta, playing the Princess in The Student Prince. The Manchester Guardian praised her "mellow and even moving voice" in a 1951 revival of Bless the Bride. She played Bloody Mary in the original West End production of South Pacific at the Theatre Royal, Drury Lane (1951), and her later roles in Rodgers and Hammerstein musicals included Lady Thiang and sometimes Anna in The King and I, Aunt Nettie in Carousel and roles in Flower Drum Song. She also toured in these roles in Britain and Australia. In 1959 she starred with Inia Te Wiata in a new production of Chu Chin Chow.

With the J. C. Williamson company in Australia, she played several Gilbert and Sullivan roles on tour (and the Princess in The Student Prince) in 1962, she played Anna in The King and I at the Princess Theatre in Melbourne in 1963, and again with Williamson, she toured in Lilac Time by Ivor Novello in 1964. From the 1960s to the 1980s, she toured extensively with Gilbert and Sullivan for All in the UK, US and Australia, recording seven of the contralto roles in the Savoy operas on both record and video. She had earlier recorded many of these roles, and some of her musical theatre roles, with the Michael Sammes Singers. In 1980 she appeared with John Reed and the London Savoyards in The Pirates of Penzance She also appeared with her own touring company for five years and other Gilbert and Sullivan companies.

She appeared in other musical theatre roles in shows including Robert and Elizabeth at the New Theatre in Bromley in 1968, The Umbrellas of Cherbourg at the Phoenix Theatre in 1980 and Bless the Bride at the Sadler's Wells Theatre in 1987. She played the Mother Abbess in The Sound of Music at Worthing’s Connaught Theatre in 1984, where she also played and Ernestine in Novello's Perchance to Dream, among other roles. She also played Madame Kurt in Novello's The Dancing Years in 1984 staging at the Wolsey Theatre, Ipswich, later recording the role for BBC Radio 2. Landis also appeared on the radio and the concert stage and continued to perform into her 80s.

She retired to the entertainers' rest home Denville Hall in Northwood, London in 2007, where she died eight years later, just after her 92nd birthday.

== Recordings ==
With Gilbert and Sullivan for All, in 1972, Landis recorded, on both record and video, the roles of Little Buttercup in H.M.S. Pinafore, the Fairy Queen in Iolanthe, Dame Hannah in Ruddigore, the Duchess of Plaza Toro in The Gondoliers, Katisha in The Mikado, Ruth in The Pirates of Penzance and Dame Carruthers in The Yeomen of the Guard. She sang several Sullivan songs on a 1972 Pearl disc called Sullivan.
