= Gilbert and Sullivan for All =

Programme covers

Gilbert and Sullivan for All was a touring concert and opera company, formed in 1963 by D'Oyly Carte Opera Company performers Thomas Round and Donald Adams and former director Norman Meadmore, and which exclusively performed the works of Gilbert and Sullivan, usually in concert, but sometimes giving full productions. They also recorded most of the Savoy operas both on video and audio. They continued to tour into the 1980s, occasionally reuniting for performances thereafter.

== Description ==
Gilbert and Sullivan for All gave concert performances of highlights from the Savoy operas of Gilbert and Sullivan, and sometimes full productions of the operas, throughout Britain and made several world tours to North America, Australasia, and the Far East.

== Early history ==
In 1963 Thomas Round and Donald Adams were still with D'Oyly Carte D'Oyly Carte Opera Company; together with Norman Meadmore (a former director of D'Oyly Carte), they formed Gilbert and Sullivan for All. In the early years the company, usually composed of five or six singers and a pianist, would perform on nights when D'Oyly Carte was playing The Gondoliers, since Adams was not engaged by D'Oyly Carte to play in that opera. The pianist was often the former D'Oyly Carte assistant musical director, William Cox-Ife. In 1964 Round, and in 1969 Adams, left the D'Oyly Carte Company and joined Gilbert and Sullivan for All full-time. The group's repertory included highlights from Cox and Box, Trial by Jury, H.M.S. Pinafore, The Pirates of Penzance, Iolanthe, The Mikado, Ruddigore, The Yeomen of the Guard, and The Gondoliers. Round, and sometimes Adams, acted as director for the company. Meadmore acted as producer.

== Later years ==
In 1972, the group recorded staged and costumed abridged productions of the nine operas in their repertory, both on video and for audio recordings. The soprano roles were split between former D'Oyly Carte artists Valerie Masterson and Gillian Humphreys, and all included Round and Adams. Introductions and linking narration were included and later re-recorded by Round. Helen Landis played the contralto roles in seven of the recordings and videos. In the Gilbert and Sullivan Discography, Marc Shepherd writes, "The productions, despite being heavily abridged, are beautifully costumed and staged. Business and blocking are in the traditional manner, but do not slavishly reproduce D'Oyly Carte stagings. ... These films provide rare glimpses of many former D'Oyly Carte stars." Peter Murray, another former assistant D'Oyly Carte musical director, who had become the group's regular touring pianist around 1970, conducted the orchestra, except for Cox and Box, which they performed with piano accompaniment. Other former members of D'Oyly Carte who appeared with Gilbert and Sullivan for All include Gillian Knight, Ann Hood, Mary Sansom, John Cartier, Thomas Lawlor, Pauline Wales, and Geoffrey Shovelton.

During their Gilbert and Sullivan for All years, Round and Adams also appeared on tour as Arthur Sullivan and W. S. Gilbert, respectively, in Tarantara! Tarantara!, Ian Taylor's musical about the Gilbert and Sullivan partnership. Gilbert and Sullivan for All remained active through the early 1980s, until Adams's growing career as an operatic singer and Round's increasing age forced it to close. They occasionally reunited for concert performances thereafter.
