= Michael Rayner =

English opera singer

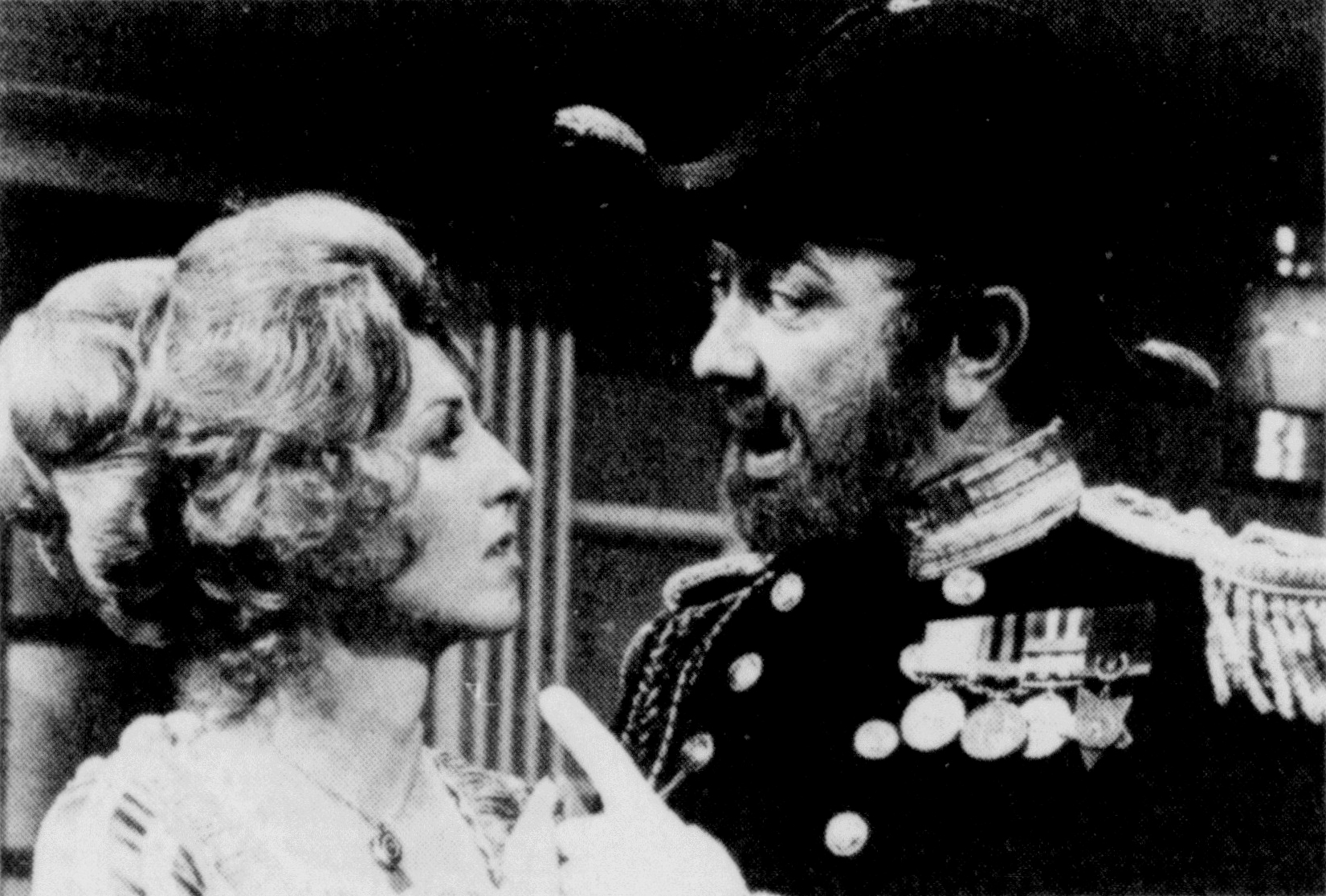
Rayner as Captain Corcoran in H.M.S. Pinafore alongside Pamela Field as Josephine, 1973

Michael Rayner (6 December 1932 – 13 July 2015) was an English opera singer, best known for his performances in baritone roles of the Savoy Operas with the D'Oyly Carte Opera Company.

Rayner worked in his family's motor car company before eventually pursuing classical singing and, in his mid-30s, he trained at the Birmingham School of Music. He then joined Welsh National Opera's "Opera for All", to tour for two years. He played more than a dozen Gilbert and Sullivan roles with the D'Oyly Carte continuously from 1971 to 1979, also recording most of these roles with the company.

Afterwards, he had a brief government service career and sang on the concert stage. He worked with several more Gilbert and Sullivan companies for three more decades, playing some of his old D'Oyly Carte roles and more than a dozen new ones. He also appeared with Hinge and Bracket and on cruise ships, and he performed his own autobiographical musical show.

== Early life and career ==
Rayner was born in Etwall in Derbyshire, the son of Howard T Rayner and Irene (née Docking). He was raised in Derby, where he was a choirboy at St Luke's Church and later St Werburgh's Church. As a young man, he apprenticed with Rolls-Royce before joining his family's motor car company, where he eventually became sales manager. At this time, he performed in amateur productions in Corby and elsewhere, including Derby Opera Company and Opera da Camera. In 1955 he married Sylvia Groome, and the couple had four children. In 1967, at age 34, Rayner decided to focus on singing and was accepted into the Birmingham School of Music. In 1969, Rayner joined the Wales National Choir and Welsh National Opera's "Opera for All", to tour for two seasons in such roles as Figaro in The Barber of Seville, Sharpless in Madam Butterfly, Frank in Die Fledermaus and the title role in Eugene Onegin.

Rayner joined the D'Oyly Carte Opera Company in 1971 as a principal baritone, immediately assuming the roles of Mr. Cox in Cox and Box, Counsel for the Plaintiff in Trial By Jury, Captain Corcoran in H.M.S. Pinafore, Samuel in The Pirates of Penzance, Strephon in Iolanthe, and Giuseppe in The Gondoliers. As Corcoran, he won critical praise for his air of authority and 'vocal size, enough to impress'". In 1972, he dropped the role of Samuel to add to his repertoire the Sergeant of Police in Pirates, and he also began to appear as Pish-Tush in The Mikado. In 1974, he added the small role of Guron in Princess Ida. For the company's 1975 Centennial Season at the Savoy Theatre, Rayner recreated the role of Mr. Goldbury Utopia Limited and sang Dr. Tannhäuser in the single concert performance of The Grand Duke. Later that year, he dropped the role of Counsel in Trial and added the role of Lieutenant of the Tower in The Yeomen of the Guard. He also exchanged the role of Cox for Sergeant Bouncer, in Cox and Box, and stepped up from Guron to Arac in Ida. Rayner participated in the company's tours of North America and Italy, and its Silver Jubilee Royal Command Performance of H.M.S. Pinafore at Windsor Castle during his tenure.

Rayner's roles recorded with D'Oyly Carte included Pish-Tush (1973), Strephon (1974), Counsel (1975), Mr. Goldbury (1976), Dr. Tannhäuser (1976), Giuseppe (1977), Bouncer (1978) and Lieutenant (1979). He also played Corcoran in the company's 1973 video production of H.M.S. Pinafore.

== Later years ==
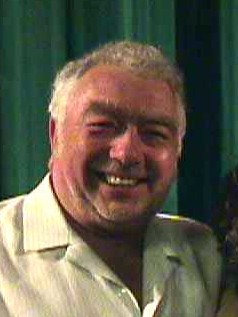
Rayner at the International Gilbert and Sullivan Festival, 1998

After a 1977 heart attack, Rayner found full-time touring to be difficult, and he eventually left the D'Oyly Carte in 1979. He initially worked in the Probation Service and then with social services, serving the elderly, and took early retirement from government service. He appeared in oratorio and other concerts for many years, in such works as Elijah, The Messiah, St. John Passion, Mozart's Requiem, and Bach and Haydn masses. From the 1980s, he worked with several more Gilbert and Sullivan companies, including G&S Unlimited, Grim's Dyke Opera Company and "The Gilbert & Sullivan Companions". New roles with these companies, in addition to some that he had played with D'Oyly Carte, included the Usher and Learned Judge in Trial, Doctor Daly in The Sorcerer, Dick Deadeye in Pinafore, Major-General Stanley in Pirates, Major Murgatroyd in Patience, Private Willis in Iolanthe, the Mikado and Pooh-Bah in The Mikado, Old Adam and Sir Roderic Murgatroyd in Ruddigore, Sergeant Meryll in Yeomen, Captain Corcoran, KCB in Utopia and the Herald in The Grand Duke, and as well as directing, coaching, and conducting master classes concerning the Savoy operas. He also appeared on cruise ships and with Hinge and Bracket and sang for many years with the Derby Cathedral Choir.

From 1996 to 2008, he played several roles with the National Gilbert & Sullivan Opera Company and other companies at the International Gilbert and Sullivan Festival in Buxton, and those roles are preserved on video and available from the Festival and excerpts with Rayner from the Festival were broadcast on Songs of Praise in 1997. He also performed an autobiographical musical show called "In the Carte". At the Festival in 1999, soprano Jean Hindmarsh and Rayner gave the world premiere performance of "Reflect, my child", a song cut from H.M.S. Pinafore before the opera opened in 1878 and reconstructed in 1998.

Rayner lived most of his life in Derby, where he remarried, in 1984, to Joy Neal, a mezzo-soprano who also performed with Derby Opera, G&S Unlimited and Grim's Dyke Opera. Rayner loved sports, especially football, and played golf. Another hobby was cooking, and he and Joy enjoyed hosting dinner parties in later years at their home in Ilkeston.

He died in Derby Hospital, aged 82, after many years of declining health and a short illness.
