= Jean Hindmarsh =

British opera singer and actress (born 1934)

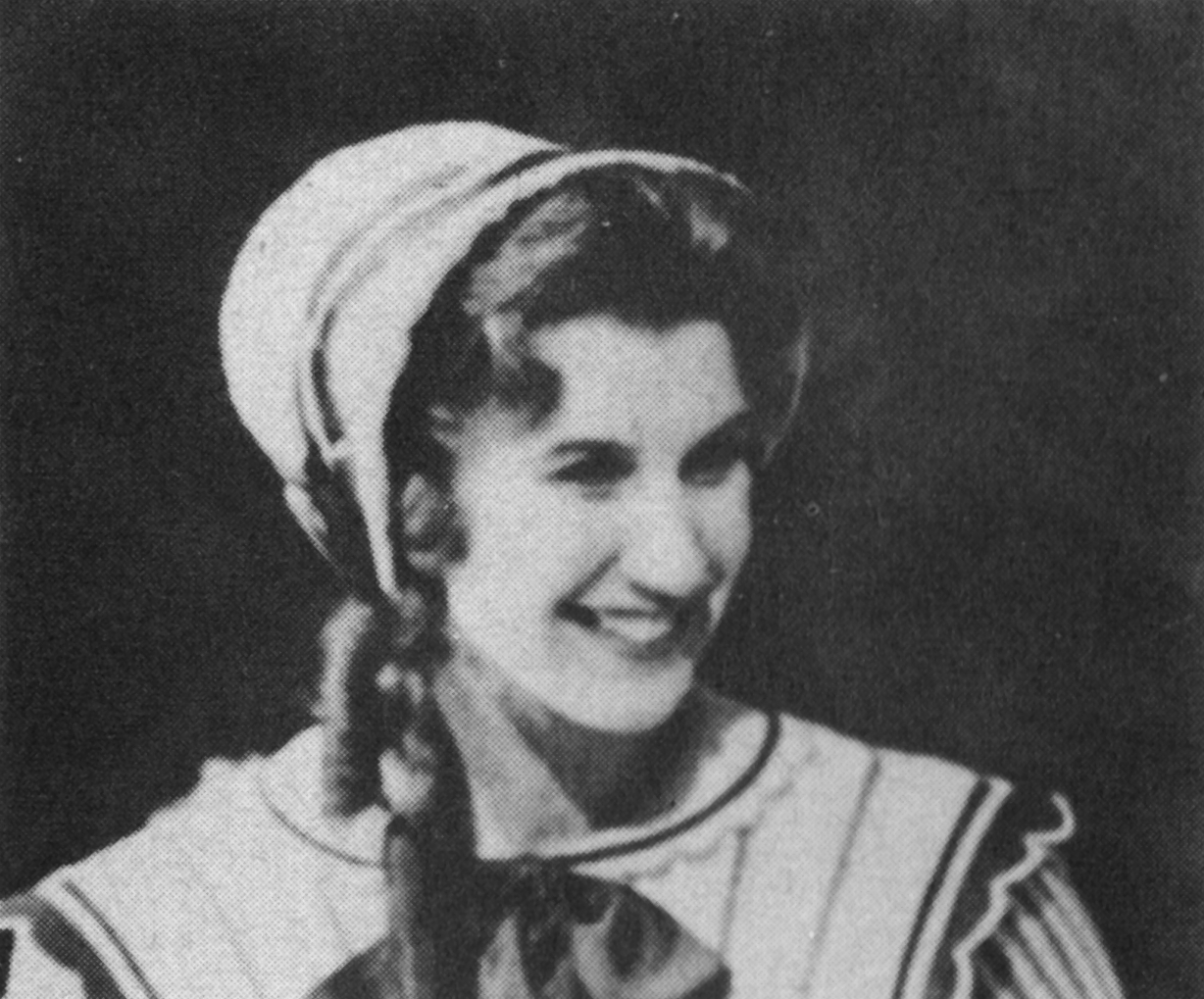
Hindmarsh as Mabel in The Pirates of Penzance, c. 1962

Jean Hindmarsh (born 1934) is a retired English singer and actress. She is best known as a principal soprano with the D'Oyly Carte Opera Company in the 1950s and 1960s.

After attending the Royal Manchester College of Music, Hindmarsh joined D'Oyly Carte in 1956 as principal soprano. She played the leading roles in six of the Gilbert and Sullivan operas with the company over the next five years and occasionally thereafter until 1969. Hindmarsh sings the lead soprano roles on four D'Oyly Carte recordings. She married in 1960, raised a family and, after leaving the opera company for the last time in 1969, worked for building societies for more than 20 years. Later in life, she gave performances and talks at the International Gilbert and Sullivan Festival.

== Biography ==
Hindmarsh was born in Leeds and educated at Lawnswood High School. There, she was prominent in the school's musical and theatrical productions, including Merrie England in 1950, in which she played Sir Walter Raleigh. Hindmarsh gained a diploma (ARMCM) from the Royal Manchester College of Music and then continued to study opera for an additional 18 months. She played the lead in two college productions and sang in concerts and oratorios. Hindmarsh was the runner-up in the first Kathleen Ferrier Competition in 1955 winning the Blackpool heat. A representative from the D'Oyly Carte Opera Company heard her performance and invited her to audition.

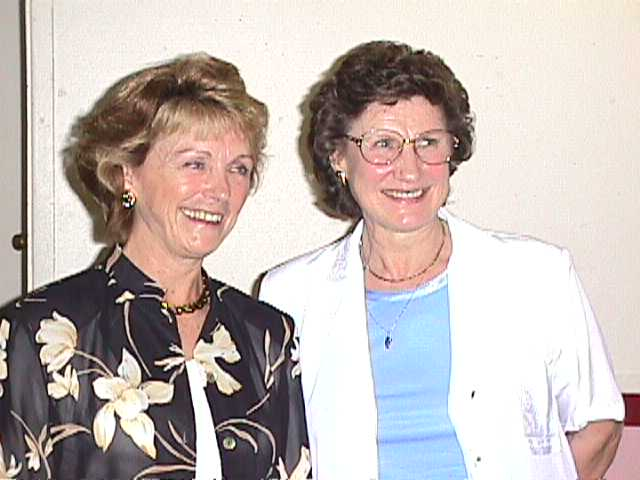
Hindmarsh (right) with Valerie Masterson in 1998

Hindmarsh was engaged by the D'Oyly Carte Opera Company in March 1956 as principal soprano. Over the next four years, she played the title role in Princess Ida, Mabel in The Pirates of Penzance, Elsie Maynard in The Yeomen of the Guard, Gianetta in The Gondoliers and Josephine in HMS Pinafore, soon adding the small role of Lady Ella in Patience. In 1959, she began instead to play the title role in Patience. Hindmarsh married in 1960 and left the D'Oyly Carte organisation when she was expecting her first child. She rejoined the company as a guest artist in her old roles for parts of the company's seasons in 1961–62, 1962–63, in the spring of 1963, 1963–64, and in the spring of 1969. These included two London seasons, one provincial tour and one American tour. In reviewing Princess Ida in 1961, The Times wrote that, in the title role, "Hindmarsh charms, amuses and ... moves the audience". That paper commented on a 1962 performance of The Gondoliers: "Outstanding among last night's cast was Miss Jean Hindmarsh, a winning Giannetta both in appearance and voice."

Several years after leaving the company, as her children grew older, Hindmarsh worked for building societies for more than 20 years, including the Leeds and Holbeck and the Leeds Permanent Building Society. In later years, she has performed and given talks at the International Gilbert and Sullivan Festival. At the Festival, in 1999, Hindmarsh and baritone Michael Rayner gave the world premiere performance of "Reflect, my child", a song cut from H.M.S. Pinafore before the opera opened in 1878 and reconstructed in 1998.

== Recordings ==
Hindmarsh sings the lead soprano roles on four D'Oyly Carte recordings: Yum-Yum in The Mikado (1957), Mabel in Pirates (1957), Josephine in Pinafore (1960), and Rose Maybud in Ruddigore (1962), even though she never played Yum-Yum or Rose with the company. Of the 1957 Pirates, reviewer Mel Moratti wrote, "The highlights must be the pairing of Thomas Round and Jean Hindmarsh as Frederic and Mabel. Their solos and duets are most delightful". The Rough Guide to Opera comments that she "is a uniquely charming Josephine" in Pinafore.
