= Donald Adams =

English opera singer and actor (1928–1996)

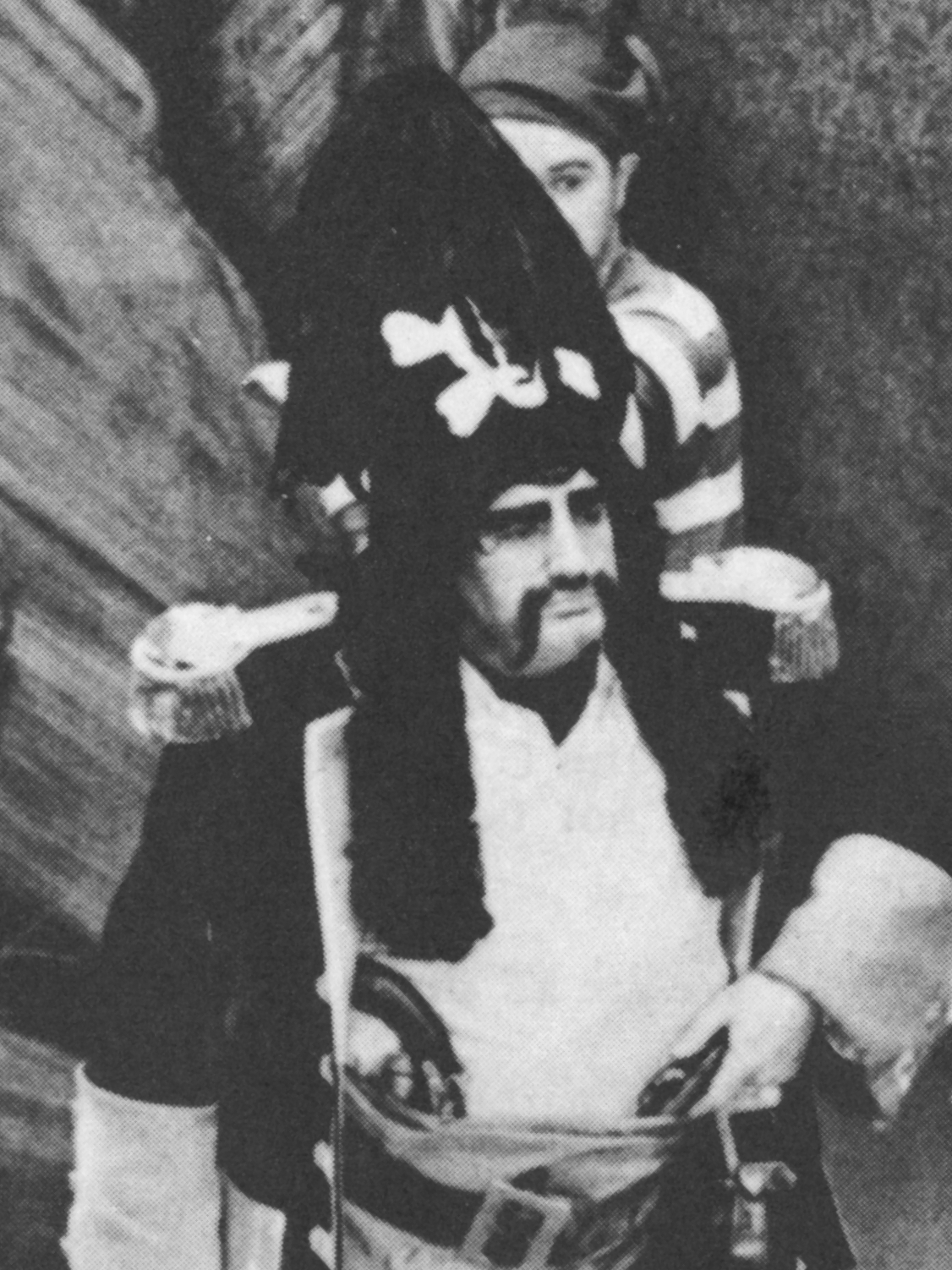
Adams as the Pirate King in The Pirates of Penzance

Charles Donald Adams (20 December 1928 – 8 April 1996) was an English opera singer and actor, best known for his performances in bass-baritone roles of the Savoy operas with the D'Oyly Carte Opera Company and his own company, Gilbert and Sullivan for All.

Adams began his career with the BBC Repertory Company in 1944. Among other early performances, he was leading man for two years at the Little Theatre, Great Yarmouth. In 1951, he joined the D'Oyly Carte organisation and soon began to play roles, becoming the company's principal bass until 1969. With Thomas Round and Norman Meadmore, he formed the touring company, Gilbert and Sullivan for All, in which he continued to sing bass and bass-baritone roles as well as directing. By the early 1980s, Adams was performing in opera and operetta throughout Britain and abroad, continuing nearly until his death. He recorded many of his roles, particularly his Gilbert and Sullivan repertoire.

== Beginnings and D'Oyly Carte years ==
Donald Adams was born in Bristol and educated at the Bristol Cathedral School, where he sang as a chorister in the cathedral and played Thomas Becket in Murder in the Cathedral at the age of sixteen. While still at school, he made his first professional appearance as an actor in 1944 with the BBC Repertory Company. He studied with an Italian singing teacher in London, Rodolfo Melle (who had sung at La Scala with the tenor Aureliano Pertile), who taught Adams to sustain the vowels of a word before reaching the consonants. This, Adams said, gave the voice "a nice line", and he continued to practise Melle's lessons until the end of his life.

Adams interrupted his fledgling stage and radio career to serve in the British Army, where he acted as resident producer of the Army Repertory Theatre at Catterick Camp. After his national service, he returned to acting and music-hall performances, gaining good notices. For two years, he was leading man at the Little Theatre, Great Yarmouth, with Aurora Productions Limited, and was a member of the quartet, The Regal Four. He also appeared in pantomime at the Euston Theatre in King's Cross. Kitty McShane asked Adams to go on tour with her and Arthur Lucan (Kitty and Old Mother Riley), during which Lucan suggested that Adams combine his singing and acting and audition for the D'Oyly Carte Opera Company.

Adams was hired by the D'Oyly Carte Opera Company as a chorister in 1951 and soon began to play the small roles of Bill Bobstay in H.M.S. Pinafore, Samuel in The Pirates of Penzance, Second Yeoman in The Yeomen of the Guard, and Antonio in The Gondoliers, eventually understudying 26 roles. The next season, he took over the principal role of Captain Corcoran in H.M.S. Pinafore and substituted for the ailing Alan Styler as Cox in Cox and Box, the Counsel in Trial by Jury and Grosvenor in Patience. He also appeared once as Old Adam Goodheart in Ruddigore and soon began to play the Lieutenant of the Tower in The Yeomen of the Guard. Adams also began to fill in for the ageing Darrell Fancourt, who missed an increasing number of performances, as the Pirate King in Pirates, Colonel Calverley in Patience, the Earl of Mountararat in Iolanthe, the title role in The Mikado and Sir Roderic Murgatroyd in Ruddigore.

When Fancourt retired at the end of the 1952–53 season, Adams became the company's principal bass-baritone, regularly playing Dick Deadeye in H.M.S. Pinafore, the Pirate King, Colonel Calverley, the Earl of Mountararat, the Mikado of Japan, Sir Roderic in Ruddigore, Sergeant Meryll in The Yeomen of the Guard, and Arac in Princess Ida (when that opera was revived in 1954). From 1961 to 1963, he also played Sergeant Bouncer in Cox and Box. Although he had admired Fancourt, when he took over the roles, Adams asked Bridget D'Oyly Carte if he could create his own characterisations, which she agreed to, saying she would tell him if he overstepped the mark. Adams continued as the principal bass-baritone of the D'Oyly Carte Opera Company until 1969. In 1952 he married D'Oyly Carte soprano Muriel Harding (1920–90).

== After D'Oyly Carte ==
In 1969, Adams began to perform full-time with Gilbert and Sullivan for All, a touring company that he had founded several years earlier with Norman Meadmore and Thomas Round. The company recorded nine of the Gilbert and Sullivan operas and toured the British Isles, North America, Australasia, and the Far East. Adams played the roles of Cox in Cox and Box, the Usher in Trial by Jury, Dick Deadeye in Pinafore, the Pirate King in Pirates, Lord Mountararat in Iolanthe, the title role in The Mikado, Sir Roderic in Ruddigore, Sergeant Meryll in Yeomen, and Don Alhambra in The Gondoliers, as well as acting as a director for the company.

While performing with Gilbert and Sullivan for All, Adams also appeared as W. S. Gilbert on tour with Thomas Round in Tarantara! Tarantara!, Ian Taylor's musical about the Gilbert and Sullivan partnership, and, again with Round, recorded a musical documentary, The Story of Gilbert and Sullivan, written by Dr. Thomas Heric. In 1982, he appeared in three of the Brent Walker G&S television productions as Sir Marmaduke in The Sorcerer, Colonel Calverley in Patience, and Sir Roderic in Ruddigore.

== Opera career and sudden death ==
Beginning in the early 1980s, Adams began to perform in operettas and opera. He was invited by Matthew Epstein to sing the title role in the Peter Sellars version of The Mikado in Chicago in 1983, which led to many seasons there, including as Baron Zeta in The Merry Widow and the Theatre Director and the Banker in Lulu. He sang Alfred Doolittle in My Fair Lady for Scottish Opera in December 1983.

He made his Covent Garden debut on 4 November 1983 as a Frontier Guard in Boris Godunov (having also prepared the role of a monk) going on to sing Quince in A Midsummer Night's Dream in July 1986, and Colonel Frank, the prison governor, in Die Fledermaus, a role, said The Times, that suited his comic talents to perfection. Returning to Covent Garden in 1993, he gave "excellent performances of Badger and the Priest" in The Cunning Little Vixen.

Adams sang with English National Opera many times, beginning in 1985 as Dikoj in Katya Kabanova, Mozart's Bartolo in 1991 and 1993 ("the only truly rounded, Mozart-size performance is the Dr Bartolo of the immortal Donald Adams", said The Times), Pooh-Bah in The Mikado, Alcindoro/Benoit in La bohème in 1991, the Woodcutter in Königskinder in 1992, Mumlal in The Two Widows in 1993, Quince in A Midsummer Night's Dream in 1995, and Don Pasquale (1996). For Welsh National Opera, between 1985 and 1987, he appeared as Monterone in Rigoletto, Zeta in The Merry Widow and the Theatre Director and the Banker in Lulu. His Baron Ochs in Der Rosenkavalier (1990) for WNO was described by The Independent as "a triumph for the singer, now 62 years of age, and no longer in his finest or freshest voice, but who made up for any vocal deficiency by the marvellously subtle way he handled the text".

At Glyndebourne Festival beginning in 1988 he sang Quince, the lawyer Swallow in Peter Grimes, and Antonio in the production of The Marriage of Figaro which opened the new opera house at Glyndebourne in May 1994. His other international work included Schigolch in Lulu for Canadian Opera in 1991, Rossini's Bartolo in Amsterdam, the Sacristan in Tosca in Geneva (June 1987) and the Mikado in Los Angeles (with Dudley Moore).

He also continued to record, especially with Charles Mackerras and Welsh National Opera, appearing as Sergeant Meryll in the Welsh National Opera production of Yeomen 1994–95, the first Gilbert and Sullivan production staged at the Royal Opera House. His last appearance, only a month before his death, was with English National Opera in Don Pasquale. The Times, in its obituary of Adams, concluded: "At the time of his death Adams had a diary as packed as any leading opera singer half his age. He was particularly looking forward to a performance in Benjamin Britten's A Midsummer Night's Dream at the Metropolitan Opera".

Adams also composed and arranged music. In his last years, Adams was president of the Cambridge University Gilbert and Sullivan Society. He died in Norwich, England, at the age of 67 of a brain tumour.

== Recordings ==
Adams recorded prolifically. With the D'Oyly Carte Opera Company and Decca Records, he recorded Sergeant Bouncer in Cox and Box (1961), the Usher in Trial by Jury (1964), the Notary in The Sorcerer (1953), Sir Marmaduke in The Sorcerer (1966), Dick Deadeye in H.M.S. Pinafore (1960), the Pirate King in Pirates (1958 and 1968), Colonel Calverley in Patience (1961), Mountararat in Iolanthe (1960), Arac in Princess Ida (1955 and 1965), the Mikado in The Mikado (1958), Sir Roderic in Ruddigore (1962), Sergeant Meryll in Yeomen (1964), and King Paramount in Utopia Limited (1964 excerpts). He also appeared in the title role in D'Oyly Carte's 1966 film of The Mikado and as the voice of Sir Roderic Murgatroyd in the Halas and Batchelor cartoon version of Ruddigore.

Adams was one of several D'Oyly Carte artists to appear on a Reader's Digest collection, "The Best of Gilbert and Sullivan", in 1963. He was prohibited by contract from recording the roles he had played with D'Oyly Carte, and so in this collection he sang Ko-Ko in The Mikado, the Sergeant of Police in Pirates, Private Willis in Iolanthe, Don Alhambra in The Gondoliers, and Reginald Bunthorne and Major Murgatroyd in Patience.

In the 1970s, Adams also recorded roles with Gilbert and Sullivan for All. These were complete recordings of Trial by Jury and Cox and Box, and excerpts (as much as would fit on two sides of an LP record) of seven others. He also made two recordings of lesser-known Sullivan music. With Charles Mackerras and Welsh National Opera's Gilbert and Sullivan series, begun in 1992, Adams recorded the title role in The Mikado, the Pirate King in The Pirates of Penzance, Dick Deadeye in H.M.S. Pinafore, and Sergeant Meryll in The Yeomen of the Guard.

Other complete recordings include Janáček's Katya Kabanova (Dikoj) in 1988 (video), Mozart's The Marriage of Figaro (Antonio), in 1994 (video), and Stravinsky's The Rake's Progress (Trulove) in 1995 (CD).
