= Pauline Wales =

English singer and actress (1937–2020)

Pauline Wales (12 December 1937 – 23 January 2020) was an English singer and actress best known for her performances in the mezzo-soprano roles of the Gilbert and Sullivan operas with the D'Oyly Carte Opera Company.

After beginning her career in concert singing and musical theatre, Wales joined the chorus of D'Oyly Carte in 1959, soon performing smaller roles. By 1963, she was performing a mix of small and larger roles, also understudying some of the larger mezzo-soprano roles. She continued to appear with the company until 1975, recording several of her roles. After this, she played in other Gilbert and Sullivan troupes and taught voice privately.

== Life and career ==
Wales was born at Stockton-on-Tees, England to a musical family. She showed an interest in singing early on and studied voice with Roy Henderson. She joined the Stockton Stage Society, where she played the soubrette lead in musical theatre productions such as The New Moon, The Maid of the Mountains, The Student Prince and The Vagabond King. Early in her career, Wales performed in oratorio and musical theatre in the north of England.

She joined the chorus of the D'Oyly Carte Opera Company in 1959. During her early years with the company, Wales performed the small roles of Isabel in The Pirates of Penzance, Leila in Iolanthe and occasionally Cousin Hebe in H.M.S. Pinafore. In 1961, when the company revived Princess Ida, Wales added the larger role of Melissa to her repertoire. She also occasionally performed the role of Phoebe Meryll in The Yeomen of the Guard. By 1963, she was also singing Hebe in Pinafore and Vittoria in The Gondoliers full-time and occasionally Lady Saphir in Patience, Pitti-Sing in The Mikado and Tessa in The Gondoliers. After Gillian Humphreys left the company in 1965, Wales moved up to the role of Kate in Pirates, took over the roles of First Bridesmaid in Trial by Jury, Saphir in Patience, Peep-Bo in The Mikado, Ruth in Ruddigore and Tessa in The Gondoliers, and continued performing the roles of Hebe, Leila and Melissa. As understudy, she also had the opportunity to play the title role in Iolanthe and Phoebe in Yeomen. She continued to perform most of these roles over the next decade.

Wales left the D'Oyly Carte organisation in 1974 but returned at the end of the year to play Melissa in Princess Ida as a guest artiste during the Gilbert and Sullivan centenary London season. Later, she sang with The Magic of D'Oyly Carte, a Gilbert and Sullivan concert group; with the Gilbert and Sullivan for All touring company; as Mad Margaret in Ruddigore for Kent Opera in 1975; and in various "Together Again" concerts at the International Gilbert and Sullivan Festival. She taught singing in Radcliffe-on-Trent, Nottinghamshire, and also directed the Radcliffe Ladies Choir.

During her time with D'Oyly Carte, Wales was married twice, first to chorister John Maguire in 1961, and then to principal bass-baritone Thomas Lawlor in 1971 (with whom she had a daughter, Frances), both of whom she divorced. Later she married Richard Howarth, the musical director of the Radcliffe-on-Trent Male Voice Choir.

Wales died in Radcliffe-on-Trent in 2020 at the age of 82.

== Recordings and broadcasts ==
With the D'Oyly Carte Opera Company, Wales recorded her roles of Leila in Iolanthe (1960), Kate in Pirates (1968), Hebe in Pinafore (1971), and Peep-Bo in The Mikado (1973). She also is heard as Hebe and Pitti-Sing on "A Gilbert and Sullivan Spectacular" (1965) and as a soloist on the recording "Songs and Snatches" (1970). In 1965, Wales participated with other D'Oyly Carte artistes in a BBC television production of Patience, playing Lady Saphir. The following year, she appeared as Peep-Bo in the 1966 film version of The Mikado, and in 1973, she played Cousin Hebe in a televised production of H.M.S. Pinafore on ITV. She also participated in the live D'Oyly Carte broadcast of Iolanthe in 1961 as Leila.
