= Valerie Masterson =

Opera singer and actress

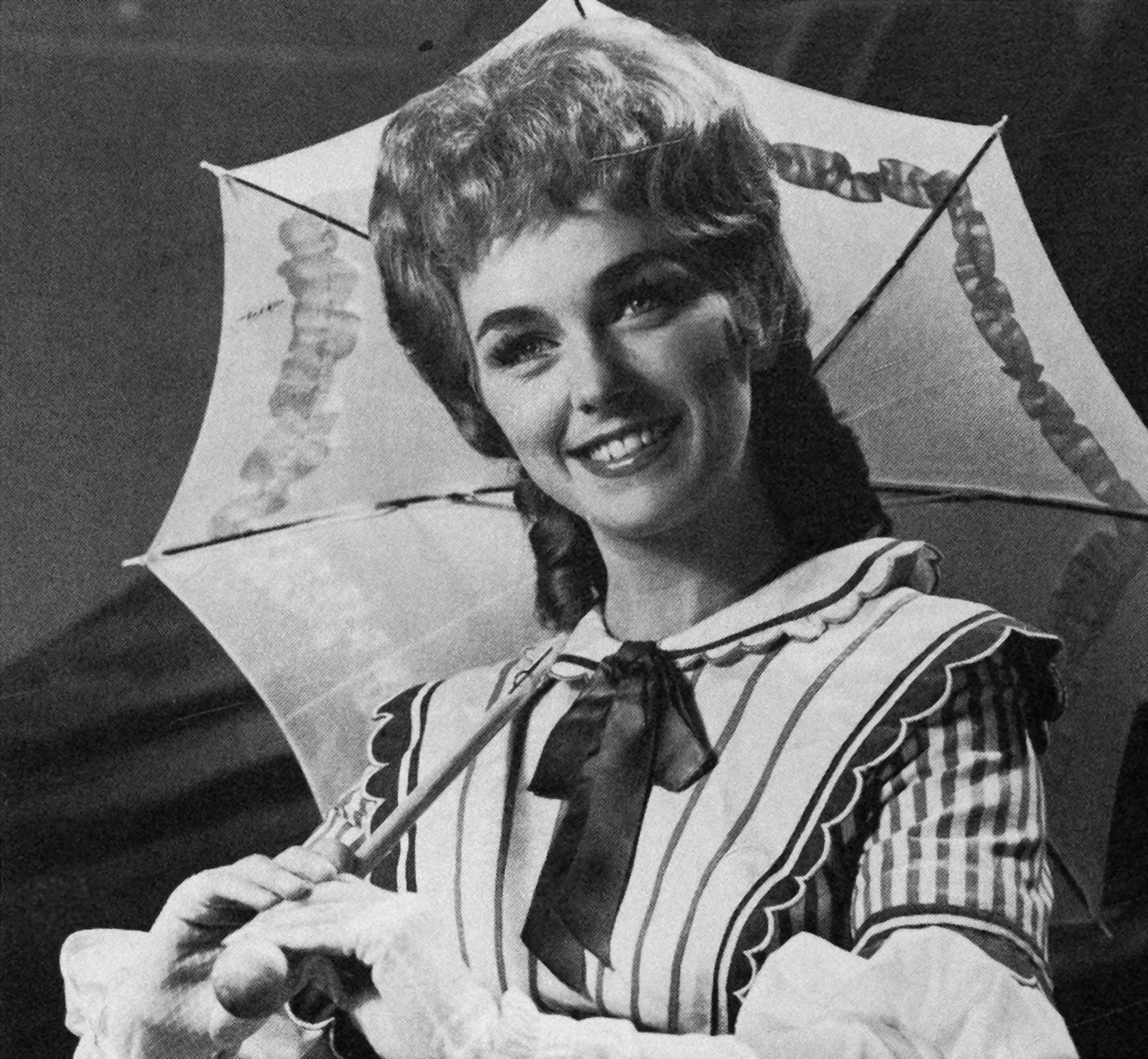
Masterson as Mabel in The Pirates of Penzance

Margaret Valerie Masterson CBE (born 3 June 1937) is a retired English opera singer, a lecturer, and Vice-President of British Youth Opera. After studying in Italy, she began to sing opera in Europe. Returning to England, Masterson performed as principal soprano with the D'Oyly Carte Opera Company from 1964 to 1969, becoming popular with audiences and participating in several of the company's recordings, as well as those of Gilbert and Sullivan for All and the BBC.

She next joined English National Opera and went on to an international opera career lasting more than three decades. Although she performed a wide variety of roles, she was best known for her roles in the French repertoire and the works of Handel, as well as Gilbert and Sullivan. Her recordings include, in addition to many opera roles, operettas and musical theatre. She has been appointed a CBE and is a Fellow of the Royal College of Music.

== Early career and D'Oyly Carte ==
Masterson was born in Birkenhead, Cheshire, and studied at the Matthay School of Music (Liverpool) and at the Royal College of Music. She received good reviews for her student performances. The Times commented on her "welcome freshness", though on another occasion it found fault with her attempt at a Scottish accent in a Robert Burns evening at the Wigmore Hall, calling it "more of Kensington than Kilmarnock". Nevertheless, the paper judged her "good to listen to" and "intelligent".

She studied for a year in Milan with the soprano Adelaide Saraceni, but her most important teacher was the London-based tenor Eduardo Asquez. She made her debut as Frasquita in Bizet's Carmen in Salzburg with the Landestheatre Opera Company, where she spent a season in 1963 singing roles in Italian, French, and German operas. The following year, she returned to England, performing in concerts, including two Promenade Concerts with Sir Malcolm Sargent. She later recalled, "I remember Sir Malcolm Sargent plucking me out of the Royal College of Music to do some Proms as a student – can you imagine that happening nowadays? – and saying to me 'Your quiet singing will make your fortune'". The music critics commended "a team of soloists led by a newcomer, Miss Valerie Masterson, with particularly pure and radiant soprano tone" in the Serenade to Music.

Masterson joined the D'Oyly Carte Opera Company as a principal soprano in 1964. After a performance as Mabel in The Pirates of Penzance, The Guardian commented, "It is Valerie Masterson's Mabel that makes one revise ideas on D'Oyly Carte standards. It is a long time since the company had so strong a soprano lead." Other critics agreed: The Times criticised D'Oyly Carte vocal standards in 1968 but called Masterson and Kenneth Sandford "shining exceptions." She remained with D'Oyly Carte for five years, where her major roles were Mabel; Josephine in H.M.S. Pinafore; Phyllis in Iolanthe; Lady Psyche, and subsequently the title role, in Princess Ida; Yum-Yum in The Mikado; Elsie Maynard in The Yeomen of the Guard; and Casilda in The Gondoliers. She appeared as Yum-Yum in the company's 1966 film version of The Mikado. She left the company in 1969 but often returned for guest appearances.

== Opera career ==
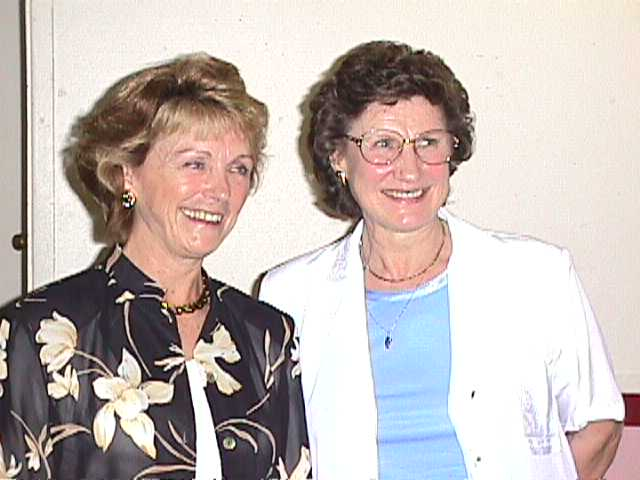
Masterson (left) with Jean Hindmarsh in 1998

Masterson went on to become principal soprano with English National Opera, from 1971, singing a wide range of roles from Mozart to Wagner and Rossini to Puccini. Her successes there included Adèle in Rossini's Le comte Ory, Micaëla in Carmen, Violetta in La traviata and the title role in Massenet's Manon ("exquisitely sung and acted"). Her many other roles there included Woglinde and the Woodbird in the Ring and Sophie and the Marschallin in Der Rosenkavalier. She made her Royal Opera House, Covent Garden debut in 1974 and her French debut at Toulouse in 1975 as Manon. For three seasons, beginning in 1975, at the Aix-en-Provence Festival, she sang a variety of roles, including "a memorable Matilde in Elisabetta, regina d'Inghilterra". Other early roles included Mimì in La bohème and Pamina in The Magic Flute. She has sung in Strasbourg (Pamina), Rouen (Countess, Marriage of Figaro), and Toulouse (Violetta).

There followed starring roles, over a career lasting more than 30 years, in major opera houses around the world. Her repertory extended from the earliest operas to late 20th century works. At Covent Garden she created the role of May in Hans Werner Henze's 1976 premiere of We Come to the River, and sang The Anne who Steals in Aulis Sallinen's 1984 opera The King Goes Forth to France, at the UK premiere on 1 April 1987. Of her 1983 Madame Lidoine in Dialogues des Carmélites, The Times wrote that Masterson "makes a sound so beautiful one wishes it could go on for ever. ... Life offers few pleasures like that of hearing Felicity Lott and Valerie Masterson singing on the same stage".

She made her debut at the Paris Opera in 1978, as Marguerite in Faust, next playing Fortune and Drusilla in Monteverdi's 1642 work, The Coronation of Poppea the same season. She later sang Constanza in The Seraglio and Gilda in Rigoletto. She also continued to have success in Mozart roles, including in Così fan tutte and Idomeneo. She sang both Susanna and the Countess in The Marriage of Figaro, appearing at the Prague National Theatre in 1993 as the Countess. She performed for two seasons at Geneva, including as Gilda in 1981 and Mireille later that year. Masterson was a member of the English National Opera company that toured five cities in the U.S. in May and June 1984, singing Gilda. She also sang roles in The Merry Widow and Lucia di Lammermoor, among others.

Masterson played a significant part in the reintroduction of Handel's operas to the mainstream repertoire. Her purity of line and facility for ornamentation, coupled with excellent diction, helped to bring to life his works which, as recently as the 1960s, were considered unperformable. In 1983, Masterson won a Laurence Olivier Award for her performance in the title role of Semele at Covent Garden. Her other Handel roles included Romilda in Xerxes for ENO, Cleopatra in Giulio Cesare opposite Janet Baker for ENO and later for Houston Grand Opera and San Francisco Opera, Berenice in Scipio for the Handel Opera Society at Sadler's Wells, and Morgana in Alcina at Aix en Provence. On the concert platform she sang the Queen of Sheba in Solomon.

Some of her most critically admired performances were in the French repertoire. Of her 1974 Manon for ENO, The Times commented, "The Coliseum has found a worthy successor to Elizabeth Harwood in the delectable form of Valerie Masterson, who has here her greatest success to date with the company. She looks at once charming, fragile and seductive, and she sings with light insouciance and easy forward tone." Her Marguerite in Gounod's Faust in Paris and London was positively reviewed: "The jewel song has the girlish delight that Gounod wanted (but does not always get) delivered in the easy coloratura Miss Masterson first displayed in The Pirates of Penzance." She sang Juliet, in Romeo and Juliet, in London and internationally, Leila in The Pearl Fishers, and the title role in Louise.

As a home-grown British soprano, Masterson became popular with wider British audiences through frequent contributions to the popular radio series Friday Night is Music Night and the TV programme The Good Old Days. She also participated in television broadcasts of several Gilbert and Sullivan operas and live relays from English National Opera.

== Honours and retirement ==
As Vice-President (and former president) of British Youth Opera, Masterson continues to work with young singers. In 1988, Masterson was made a CBE in the Queen's Birthday Honours. She was also made a Fellow of the Royal College of Music in 1992.

Masterson continued to give master-classes and to lecture about singing and her career. She often spoke at the annual International Gilbert and Sullivan Festival in Buxton, England, and performed Yum-Yum in The Mikado at that festival in 1997. She is a Patron of the Carl Rosa Opera Company.

An avid sportswoman and cooking enthusiast, she is married to former D'Oyly Carte principal flautist Andrew March.

== Recordings ==
Among her recordings are a number of Gilbert and Sullivan operas with the D'Oyly Carte Opera Company, including H.M.S. Pinafore, The Pirates of Penzance, The Mikado, The Sorcerer, and a series of Gilbert and Sullivan videos with the company Gilbert and Sullivan for All. On BBC television, Masterson appeared as Yum-Yum in 1973 and Elsie Maynard in 1975. In 1983, she recorded an album of G&S solos and duets with Robert Tear. She sang Josephine, Mabel, Ida, Yum-Yum and Elsie in the 1989 BBC2 series of the complete Gilbert and Sullivan operas. In 1997 she recorded excerpts from Ivanhoe, The Chieftain, The Beauty Stone and The Emerald Isle with the National Symphony Orchestra for the CD "Sullivan & Co. – The Operas that Got Away" Her voice is heard in the Gilbert and Sullivan songs in the film The Hand That Rocks the Cradle.

Masterson stars as Violetta on a recording in English of La traviata conducted by Sir Charles Mackerras. Also with Mackerras, she recorded the role of Cleopatra in Julius Caesar opposite Janet Baker's Caesar, and Romilda in audio and DVD recordings of Nicholas Hytner's ENO production of Serse (given in English as Xerxes). In July 1975, Masterson sang Matilde in a complete recording of Elisabetta, regina d'Inghilterra alongside Montserrat Caballé and José Carreras. She is also featured in live recordings of Faust (in Philadelphia), Mireille, Scipio, Chérubin, and the ENO Ring cycle, conducted by Reginald Goodall. The 1980 television broadcast from Glyndebourne of Die Entführung aus dem Serail, with Masterson as Constanze, has been issued on DVD. She appeared in the 1985 Tony Palmer film about Handel God Rot Tunbridge Wells!, with Anthony Rolfe Johnson singing 'Oh happy we' from Acis and Galatea.

A recital disc of her French repertoire, Valerie Masterson – en Français: Airs d’Opéra, was released in 1989. She recorded highlights from Messiah. Apart from Sullivan, her recordings of English music include Elgar's music for The Starlight Express, songs by Thomas Arne and Henry Bishop in a mixed recital disc of 1992, and a disc of English songs with Sarah Walker. Her recordings of lighter works include The King and I, Kismet, Bitter Sweet, Song of Norway, On the Town, and The Merry Widow, and a disc of show duets with Thomas Allen. Concert works recorded by Masterson include Mozart's "Great Mass".
