= Ruddigore =

1887 comic opera by Gilbert & Sullivan

The ghost scene, depicted by H. M. Brock for the first D'Oyly Carte Opera Company revival in 1921

Ruddigore; or, The Witch's Curse, originally called Ruddygore, is a comic opera in two acts, with music by Arthur Sullivan and libretto by W. S. Gilbert. It is one of the Savoy Operas and the tenth of fourteen comic operas written together by Gilbert and Sullivan. It was first performed by the D'Oyly Carte Opera Company at the Savoy Theatre in London on 22 January 1887.

The first night was not altogether a success, as critics and the audience felt that Ruddygore (as it was then called) did not measure up to its predecessor, The Mikado. After some changes, including respelling the title, it achieved a run of 288 performances. The piece was profitable, and the reviews were not all bad. For instance, The Illustrated London News praised the work of both Gilbert and, especially, Sullivan: "Sir Arthur Sullivan has eminently succeeded alike in the expression of refined sentiment and comic humour. In the former respect, the charm of graceful melody prevails; while, in the latter, the music of the most grotesque situations is redolent of fun."

There were further changes and cuts, including a new overture, when Rupert D'Oyly Carte revived Ruddigore after the First World War. Although never a big money-spinner, it remained in the repertoire until the company closed in 1982. A centenary revival at Sadler's Wells in London restored the opera to almost its original first-night state. In 2000, Oxford University Press published a scholarly edition of the score and libretto, edited by Sullivan scholar David Russell Hulme. This restores the work as far as possible to the state in which its authors left it and includes a substantial introduction that explains many of the changes, with appendices containing some music deleted early in the run. After the expiration of the British copyright on Gilbert and Sullivan works in 1961, and especially since the Sadler's Wells production and recording, various directors have experimented with restoring some or all of the cut material in place of the 1920s D'Oyly Carte version.

== Background ==
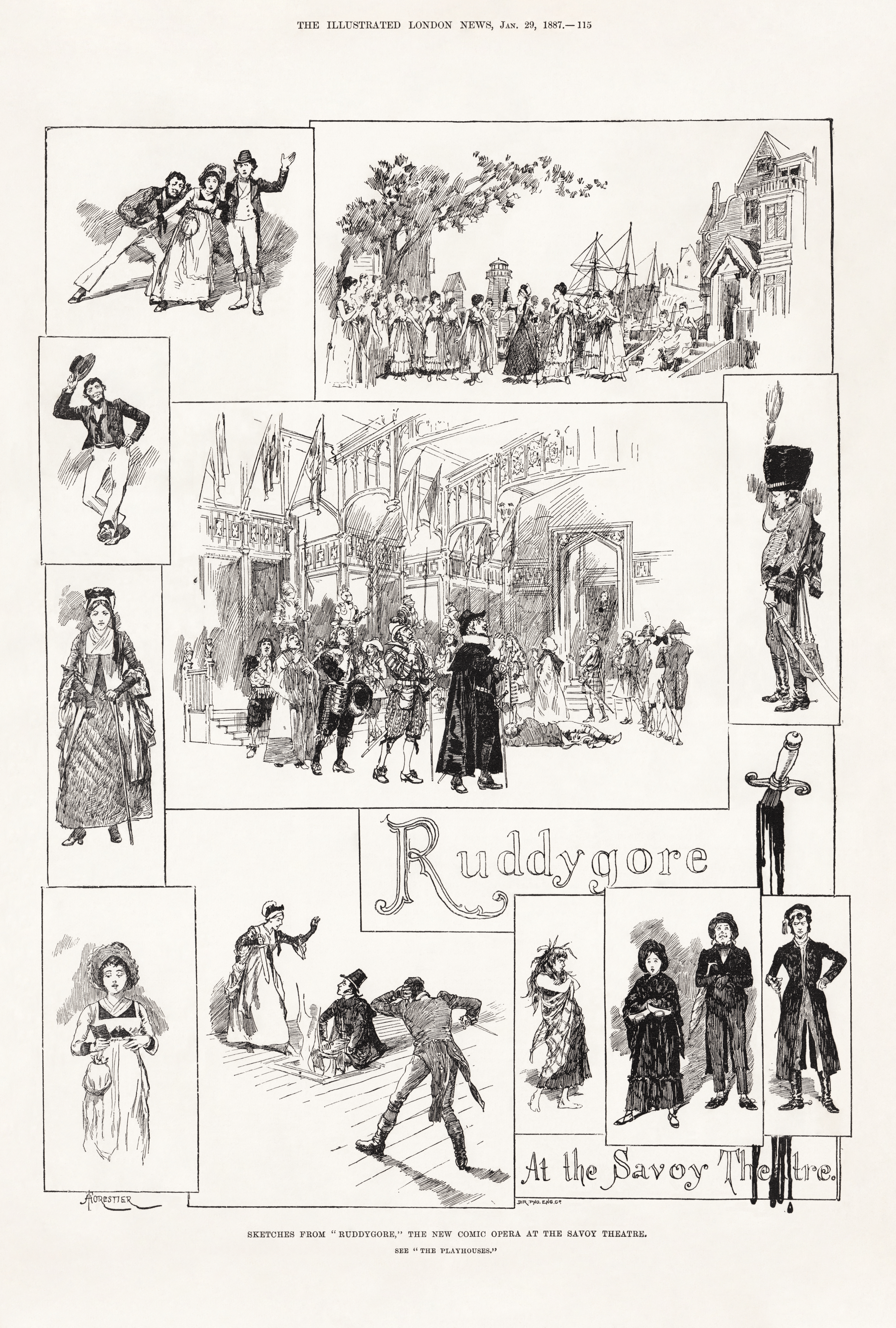
Amédée Forestier's illustration of scenes in The Illustrated London News, before the opera's name change

After The Mikado opened in 1885, Gilbert, as usual, promptly turned his thoughts to finding a subject for a next opera. Some of the plot elements of Ruddigore had been introduced by Gilbert in his earlier one-act opera, Ages Ago (1869), including the tale of the wicked ancestor and the device of the ancestors stepping out of their portraits. Heinrich Marschner's 1828 opera, Der Vampyr, involves a Lord Ruthven who must abduct and sacrifice three maidens or die. Locals claim that the Murgatroyd ancestors in Ruddigore are based on the Murgatroyd family of East Riddlesden Hall, West Yorkshire. According to his biographers, Sidney Dark and Rowland Grey, Gilbert also drew on some of his earlier verse, the Bab Ballads, for some plot elements. The song "I know a youth who loves a little maid" can be traced back to the Bab Ballad "The Modest Couple", in which the very shy and proper Peter and Sarah are betrothed but are reluctant to shake hands or sit side by side. Sir Roderic's Act II song "When the night wind howls" had its forerunner in one of Gilbert's verses published in Fun magazine in 1869:

Fair phantom, come! The moon's awake,
The owl hoots gaily from its brake,
The blithesome bat's a-wing.
Come, soar to yonder silent clouds;
The ether teems with peopled shrouds:
We'll fly the lightsome spectre crowds,
Thou cloudy, clammy thing!

The opera also includes and parodies elements of melodrama, popular at the Adelphi Theatre. There is a priggishly good-mannered poor-but-virtuous heroine, a villain who carries off the maiden, a hero in disguise and his faithful old retainer who dreams of their former glory days, the snake-in-the-grass sailor who claims to be following his heart, the wild, mad girl, the swagger of fire-eating patriotism, ghosts coming to life to enforce a family curse, and so forth. But Gilbert, in his customary topsy-turvy fashion, turns the moral absolutes of melodrama upside down: The hero becomes evil, the villain becomes good, and the virtuous maiden changes fiancés at the drop of a hat. The ghosts come back to life, foiling the curse, and all ends happily.

Sullivan delayed in setting Ruddigore to music through most of 1886. He had committed to a heavy conducting schedule and to compose a cantata, The Golden Legend, for the triennial Leeds Music Festival in October 1886. He also was squiring Fanny Ronalds to numerous social functions. Fortunately, The Mikado was still playing strongly, and Sullivan prevailed on Gilbert to delay production of Ruddigore. He got down to business in early November, however, and rehearsals for the opera's premiere by the D'Oyly Carte Opera Company began in December. During the Act II ghost scene, it would be impossible for the cast to see Sullivan's baton when the stage was darkened for the Ancestors' reincarnation. A technological solution was found: Sullivan used a glass tube baton containing a platinum wire that glowed a dull red.

The opera encountered some criticism from audiences at its opening on 22 January 1887, and one critic wondered if the libretto showed "signs of the failing powers of the author". After a run shorter than any of the earlier Gilbert and Sullivan operas premiered at the Savoy except Princess Ida, Ruddigore closed in November 1887 to make way for a revival of H.M.S. Pinafore. To allow the revival of the earlier work to be prepared at the Savoy, the last two performances of Ruddigore were given at the Crystal Palace, on 8 and 9 November.

Ruddigore was not revived in Britain during the lifetimes of either the composer or librettist, although Gilbert tried to find a producer for a revival in 1910, independent of Helen Carte's series of revivals at the Savoy. It was revived by Rupert D'Oyly Carte in 1920, remained in the company's regular repertory, and rejoined the regular repertory of many Gilbert and Sullivan companies.

== Roles ==
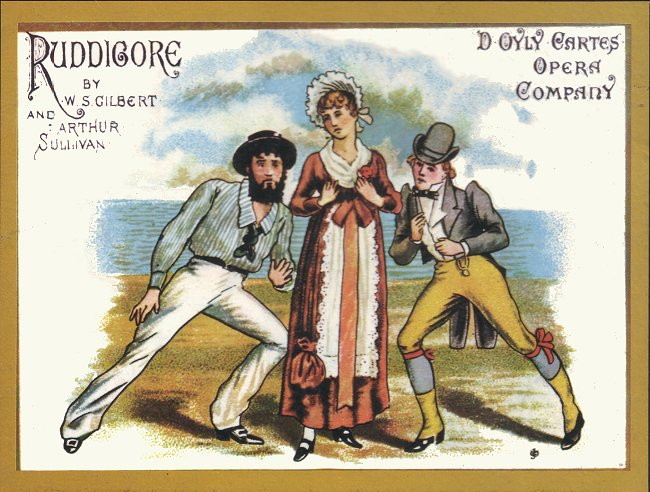
Richard, Rose and Robin

Mortals

- Sir Ruthven Murgatroyd Disguised as Robin Oakapple, a Young Farmer (comic baritone)
- Richard Dauntless His Foster-Brother – A Man-o'-war's-man (tenor)
- Sir Despard Murgatroyd of Ruddigore, A Wicked Baronet (bass-baritone or baritone)
- Old Adam Goodheart Robin's Faithful Servant (bass)
- Rose Maybud A Village Maiden (soprano)
- Mad Margaret (mezzo-soprano)
- Dame Hannah Rose's Aunt (contralto)
- Zorah Professional Bridesmaid (soprano)
- Ruth Professional Bridesmaid (speaking/chorus)
- Chorus of Professional Bridesmaids, Villagers, Bucks and Blades

Ghosts

- Sir Rupert Murgatroyd The First Baronet
- Sir Jasper Murgatroyd The Third Baronet
- Sir Lionel Murgatroyd The Sixth Baronet
- Sir Conrad Murgatroyd The Twelfth Baronet
- Sir Desmond Murgatroyd The Sixteenth Baronet
- Sir Gilbert Murgatroyd The Eighteenth Baronet
- Sir Mervyn Murgatroyd The Twentieth Baronet
- Sir Roderic Murgatroyd The Twenty-first Baronet (bass-baritone)
- Chorus of Ancestors

== Synopsis ==
=== Act I ===
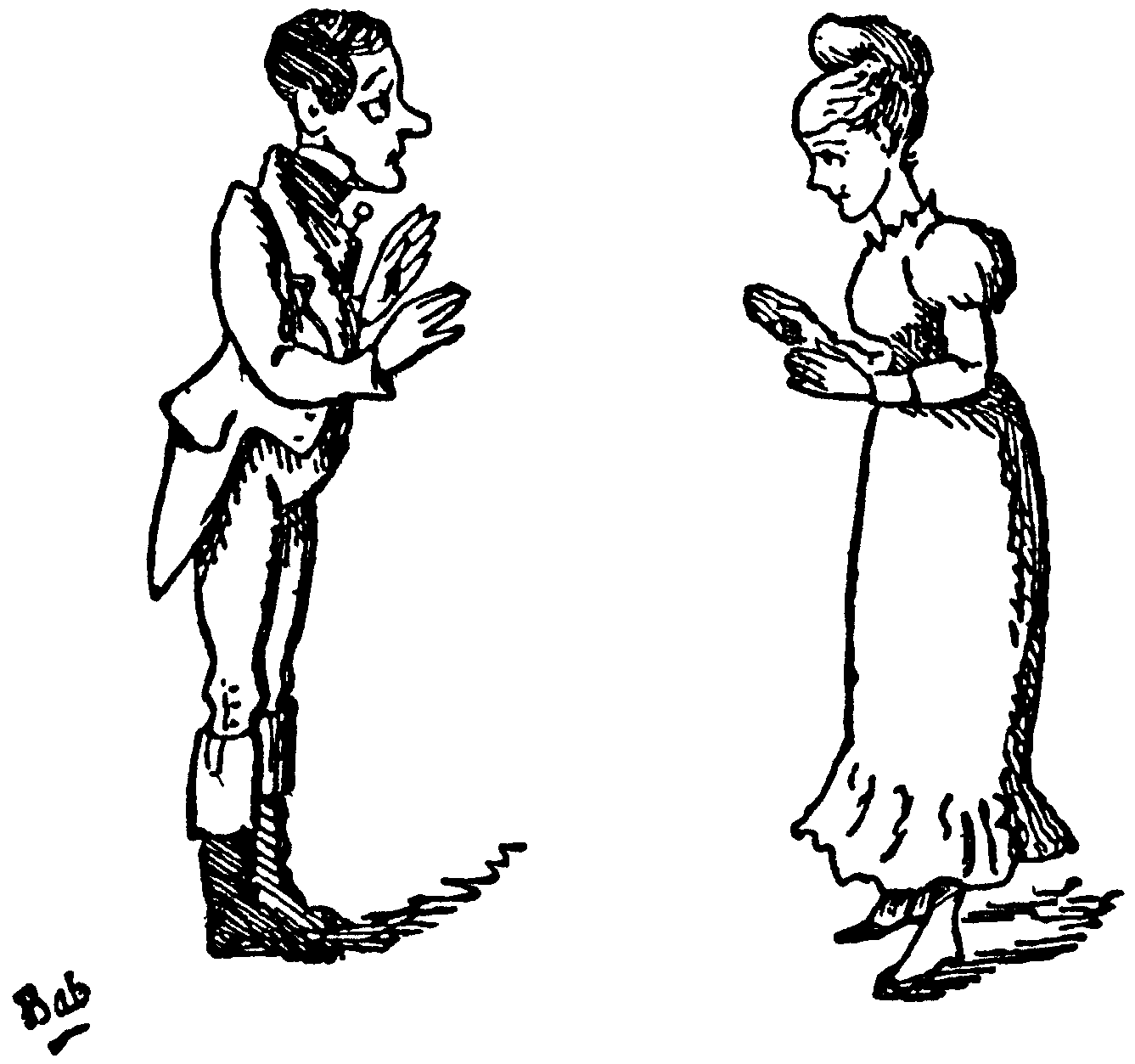
Robin and Rose

In the town of Rederring, in Cornwall, a chorus of professional bridesmaids frets that there have been no weddings for the last six months. All of the eligible young men are hopeful of a union with Rose Maybud, the prettiest maiden in the village, yet they are too timid to approach her. The desperate bridesmaids ask Rose's aunt, Dame Hannah, if she would consider marrying, but she has vowed to remain eternally single. Many years previously, she had been betrothed to "a god-like youth" who turned out to be Sir Roderic Murgatroyd, one of the bad baronets of Ruddigore. Only on her wedding day had she discovered his true identity.

Dame Hannah tells the bridesmaids about the curse of Ruddigore. Centuries ago, Sir Rupert Murgatroyd, the first Baronet of Ruddigore, had persecuted witches. One of his victims, as she was burnt at the stake, cursed all future Baronets of Ruddigore to commit a crime every day, or perish in inconceivable agonies. Every Baronet of Ruddigore since then had fallen under the curse's influence, and died in agony once he could no longer bring himself to continue a life of crime.

After the horrified bridesmaids exit, Dame Hannah greets her niece, Rose, and asks whether there is any young man in the village whom she could love. Rose, who takes her ideas of Right and Wrong from a book of etiquette, replies that all of the young men she meets are either too rude or too shy. Dame Hannah asks particularly about Robin Oakapple, a virtuous farmer, but Rose replies that he is too diffident to approach her, and the rules of etiquette forbid her from speaking until she is spoken to. Robin enters, claiming to seek advice from Rose about "a friend" who is in love. Rose says that she has such a friend too, but Robin is too shy to take the hint. Rose's devotion to etiquette prevents her from taking the first step, and so they part.

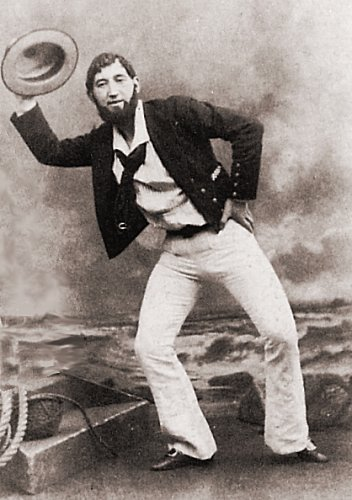
Durward Lely as Dauntless

Old Adam, Robin's faithful servant, arrives and addresses Robin as Sir Ruthven (pronounced "Rivven") Murgatroyd. Robin reveals that he is indeed Sir Ruthven, having fled his home twenty years previously to avoid inheriting the Baronetcy of Ruddigore and its attendant curse. He tells Adam never to reveal his true identity. Now Richard Dauntless, Robin's foster-brother, arrives after ten years at sea. Robin tells him that he is afraid to declare his love to Rose, and Richard offers to speak to her on his behalf. When Richard sees Rose, however, he falls in love with her himself and proposes immediately. After consulting her book of etiquette, Rose accepts. When Robin finds out what has happened, he points out his foster-brother's many flaws through a series of backhanded compliments. Realising her mistake, Rose breaks her engagement with Richard and accepts Robin.

Mad Margaret appears, dishevelled and crazed. She has been driven to madness by her love for Sir Despard Murgatroyd, the "Bad Baronet". She is jealously seeking Rose Maybud, having heard that Sir Despard intends to carry Rose off as one of his daily "crimes". Rose tells her, however, that she need not fear, as she is pledged to another. They leave just in time to avoid the arrival of the Bucks and Blades, who have come to court the village girls, followed by Sir Despard, who proceeds to frighten everyone away. He muses that, although he is forced by the family curse to commit a heinous crime every day, he commits the crime early, and for the rest of the day he does good works. Richard approaches him and discloses that Despard's elder brother Ruthven is alive, calls himself Robin Oakapple, and is going to marry Rose later that day. The elated Despard declares himself free of the curse, as he can now transfer the baronetcy to his brother.

The village gathers to celebrate the nuptials of Rose and Robin. Sir Despard interrupts, revealing that Robin is his elder brother and must accept his rightful title as the Bad Baronet. Rose, horrified at Robin's true identity, resolves to marry Despard – who refuses her: now free of the curse, the ex-baronet takes up with his old love and fiancée Mad Margaret, who is ecstatic. Rose then accepts Richard, as he "is the only one that's left." Robin leaves to take up his rightful identity as Sir Ruthven Murgatroyd.

=== Act II ===
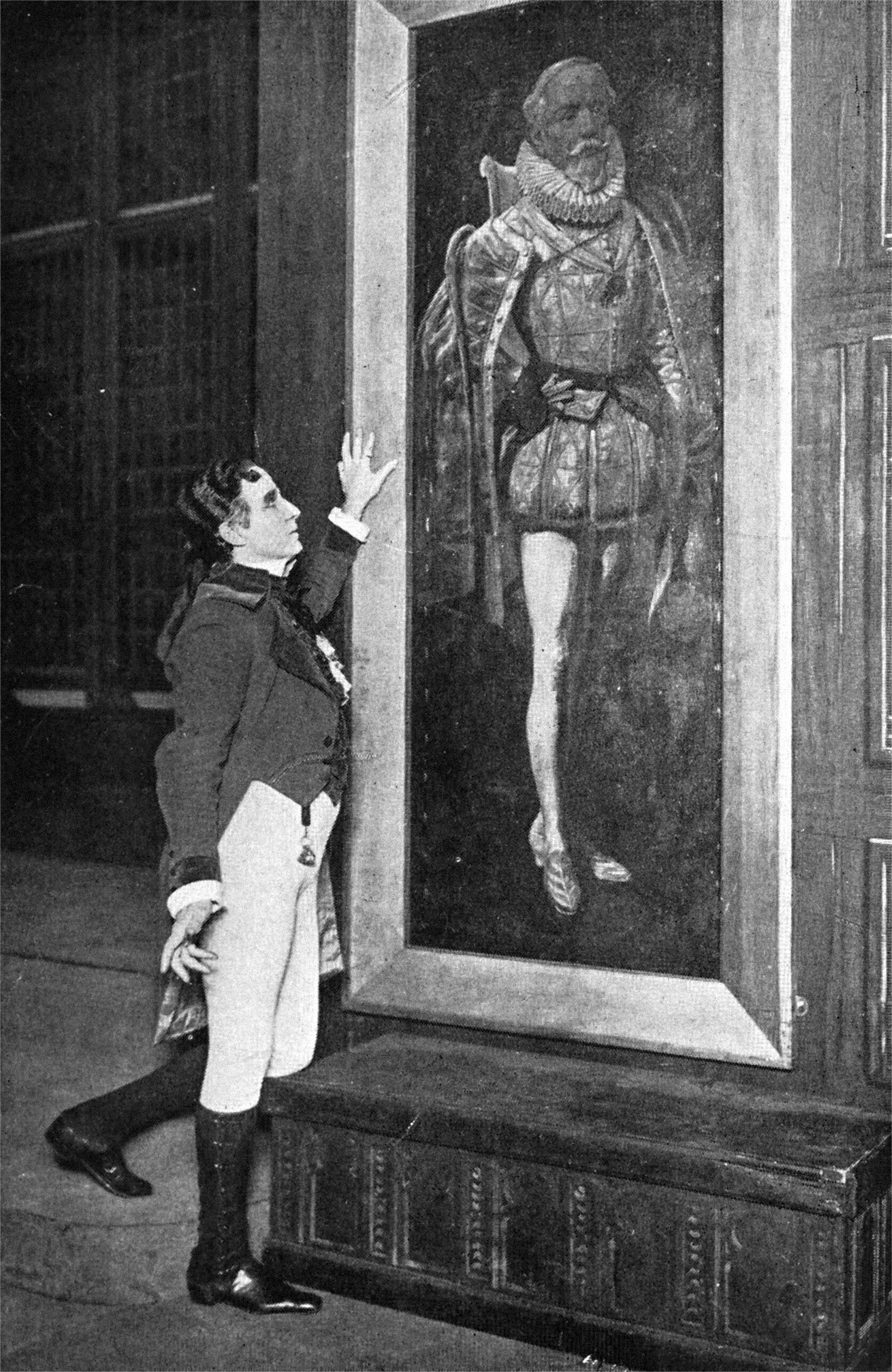
Henry Lytton as Sir Ruthven

At Ruddigore Castle, Robin (now Sir Ruthven) tries to come to grips with being a bad baronet, a task at which he proves to be spectacularly lacking. Old Adam suggests various evil crimes, but Robin prefers minor acts that are not criminal, but "simply rude". Richard and Rose enter to ask Robin's consent to their marriage, which he gives grudgingly.

When the night wind howls
"When the night wind howls" sung by Darrell Fancourt (Sir Roderic) with chorus, 1924.

Robin's weak crimes stir his ancestral ghosts from their usual haunt of the castle's portrait gallery. The curse requires them to ensure that their successors are duly committing a crime every day, and to torture them to death if they fail. They inquire as to Robin's compliance with this requirement. They are not pleased to learn that the newly-recognised baronet's crimes range from the underwhelming (filing a false income tax return: "Nothing at all", say the ghosts; "Everybody does that. It's expected of you.") to the ridiculous (forging his own will and disinheriting his unborn son). Robin's uncle, the late Sir Roderic Murgatroyd, orders him to "carry off a lady" that day or perish in horrible agony. After the ghosts treat him to a sample of the agonies he would face, Robin reluctantly agrees. He tells Adam to go to the village and abduct a lady – "Any lady!"

Despard, meanwhile, has atoned for his previous ten years of evil acts and has married Mad Margaret. The two of them now live a calm, dispassionate life of moderately-paid public service. They come to the castle and urge Robin to renounce his life of crime. When Robin asserts that he has done no wrong yet, they remind him that he is morally responsible for all the crimes Despard had done in his stead. Realising the extent of his guilt, Robin resolves to defy his ancestors.

Adam has now complied with Robin's orders but has unfortunately chosen to abduct Dame Hannah. The dame proves formidable indeed, and Robin cries out for his uncle's protection. Sir Roderic duly appears, recognises his former love and, angered that his former fiancée has been abducted, dismisses Robin. Left alone, he and Dame Hannah enjoy a brief reunion. Robin interrupts them, accompanied by Rose, Richard and the bridesmaids. He quibbles that, under the terms of the curse, a Baronet of Ruddigore can die only by refusing to commit a daily crime. Refusing is therefore "tantamount to suicide", but suicide is, itself, a crime. Thus, he reasons, his predecessors "ought never to have died at all."* Roderic follows this logic and agrees, stating that he is "practically" alive.

Now that Robin is free of the curse, Rose once again drops Richard and happily resumes her engagement to Robin. Roderic and Dame Hannah embrace, while Richard settles for the First Bridesmaid, Zorah.

- Note: In the original ending, all of the ghosts came back to life. In the revised ending substituted by Gilbert after the premiere, only Sir Roderic comes back to life.

== Musical numbers ==
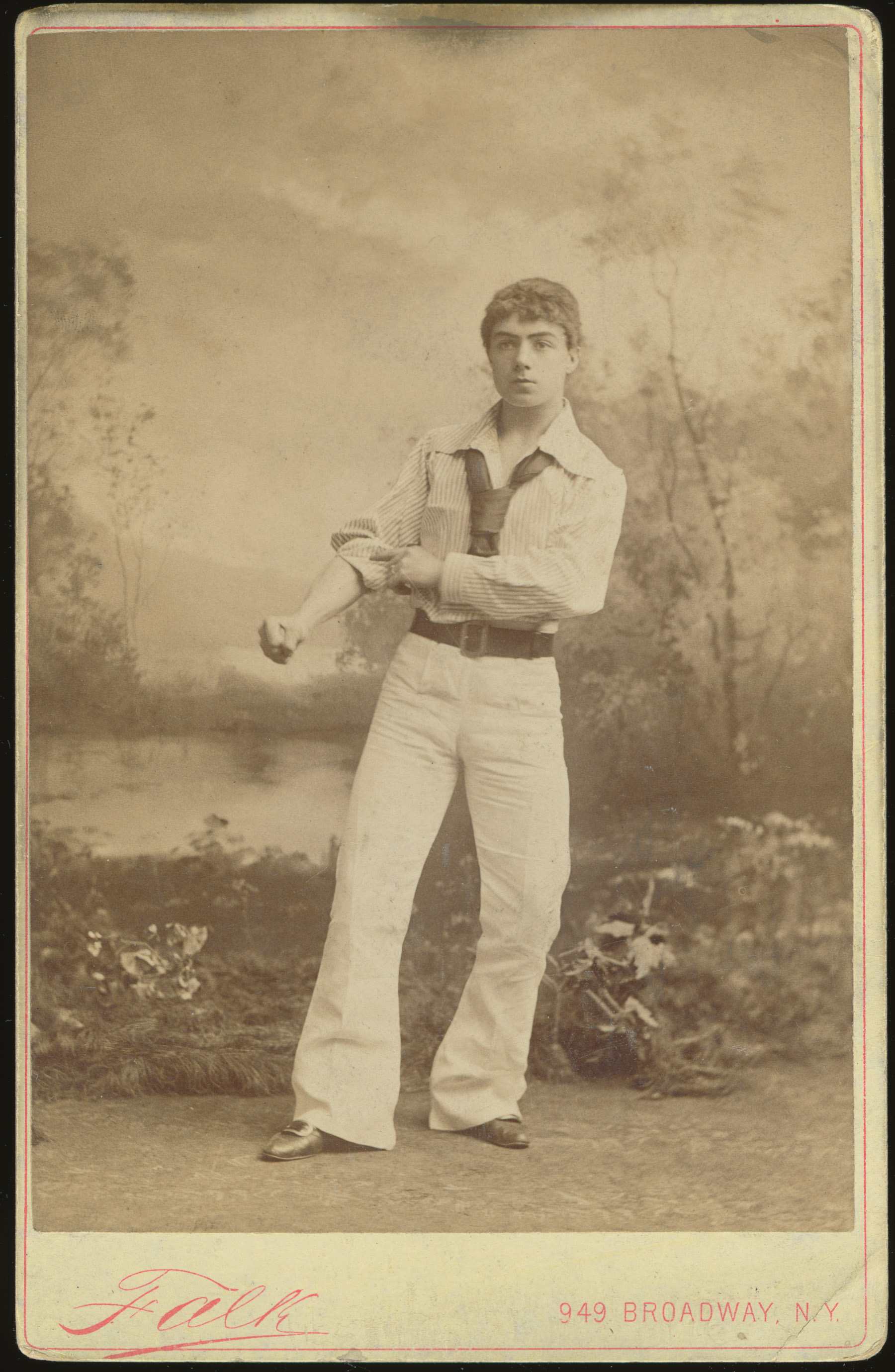
Courtice Pounds as Richard in the original New York production (1887)

- Original Overture (arranged by Hamilton Clarke, includes "I once was as meek", "Oh, why am I moody and sad?", "Welcome, gentry", "The battle's roar is over" and "When a man has been a naughty Baronet")
- Revised Overture (arranged by Geoffrey Toye, 1920; includes "I once was as meek", "When the night wind howls", "I know a youth", "My eyes are fully open", "I shipped, d'ye see" and Hornpipe)

Act I

- 1. "Fair is Rose" (Chorus of Bridesmaids)
- 2. "Sir Rupert Murgatroyd" (Hannah and Chorus)
- 3. "If somebody there chanced to be" (Rose)
- 4. "I know a youth" (Rose and Robin)
- 5. "From the briny sea" (Chorus of Bridesmaids)
- 6. "I shipp'd, d'ye see, in a revenue sloop" (Richard and Chorus)
- 6a. Hornpipe
- 7. "My boy, you may take it from me" (Robin and Richard)
- 8. "The battle's roar is over" (Rose and Richard)
- 9. "If well his suit has sped" (Chorus of Bridesmaids)
- 10. "In sailing o'er life's ocean wide" (Rose, Richard, and Robin)
- 11. "Cheerily carols the lark" (Margaret)
- 12. "Welcome, gentry" (Double Chorus)
- 13. "Oh, why am I moody and sad?" (Sir Despard and Chorus)
- 14. "You understand? I think I do" (Richard and Sir Despard)
- 15. Finale Act I
  - "Hail the bride of seventeen summers" (Ensemble)
  - Madrigal, "When the buds are blossoming" (Ensemble)
  - "When I'm a bad Bart, I will tell taradiddles!" (Robin and Chorus)
  - "Oh, happy the lily" (Ensemble)

Act II

- 16. "I once was as meek" (Sir Ruthven and Adam)
- 17. "Happily coupled are we" (Rose and Richard)
- 18. "In bygone days" (Rose with Chorus of Bridesmaids)
- 19. "Painted emblems of a race" (Sir Ruthven, Sir Roderic, and Chorus of Ancestors)
- 20. "When the night wind howls" (Sir Roderic and Chorus)
- 21. "He yields, he yields" (Chorus)
- 22. (original) "Away, remorse!" ... "For thirty-five years I've been sober and wary" (Robin)
- 22. (replaced) "Away, remorse!" ... "Henceforth all the crimes" (Robin) (The original song was replaced about a week into the original run. For the history of this number, see Versions.)
- 23. "I once was a very abandoned person" (Margaret and Despard)
- 24. "My eyes are fully open" (Margaret, Sir Ruthven, and Despard)
- 25. "Melodrame"
- 26. "There grew a little flower" (Hannah with Sir Roderic)
- 27. Finale Act II (Ensemble)
  - "When a man has been a naughty baronet"
  - "For happy the lily" (reprise) (Ensemble) (See Versions).

== Premiere and reception ==
The first night was not as successful as the other Savoy opera premieres because of controversy over the title and the revivification of the ghosts, and reservations about the plot and music. According to the St James's Gazette, "The first act was well received by the audience. Number after number was rapturously encored, and every droll sally of dialogue was received with a shout of appreciative mirth." The interval was long (a half hour) as the elaborate picture gallery needed to be set up, but D'Oyly Carte had anticipated this and had printed indulgence slips which were distributed. It was marked by noisy hubbub when Lord Randolph Churchill was spotted in the crowd, but a loud shout of "No politics!" brought relative calm. The second act, however, ended badly. On 23 January 1887, under the heading "Their First Flat Failure; The First Gilbert and Sullivan Opera Not a Success", The New York Times reported, "When the curtain finally fell there was hissing – the first ever heard in the Savoy Theatre. The audience even voiced sentiments in words and there were shouts and cries such as these: 'Take off this rot!' 'Give us The Mikado!'" The paper added, "(T)he name is decidedly against it."

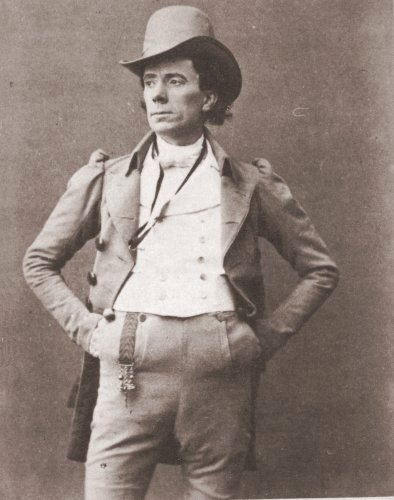
George Grossmith as Robin Oakapple

The performance was hampered by an off night for Leonora Braham as Rose Maybud and by George Grossmith's usual first night jitters, a week after which he fell dangerously ill and had to be replaced by his understudy, Henry Lytton, for almost three weeks. Sullivan noted in his diary, "Production of Ruddigore [sic] at Savoy. Very enthusiastic up to the last 20 minutes, then the audience showed dissatisfaction."

=== Critical reception ===
On the day of the premiere, The New York Times, whose correspondent attended the dress rehearsal the day before, warned, "The music is not up to the standard of Sir Arthur Sullivan. As a whole it is largely commonplace ... Gilbert's dialogue in the first act is here and there very amusing, but in the second it is slow and tedious." The press generally agreed with the Savoy audience that the second act of the premiere was inferior to the first. The Times opined that "the fun which runs alive in the first act runs completely dry in the second, which is long and tedious, and winds up with an anti-climax of inanity." The Times praised both the libretto and the music of the first act ("Everything sparkles with the flashes of Mr. Gilbert's wit and the graces of Sir Arthur Sullivan's melodiousness... one is almost at a loss what to select for quotation from an embarrassment of humorous riches.") but rated the score, as a whole, "of a fair average kind, being not equal to The Sorcerer but certainly superior to Princess Ida." Punch also thought the second act weak: "The idea of the burlesque is funny to begin with, but not to go on with". The Pall Mall Gazette thought the libretto "as witty and fanciful as any of the series" though "the second half of the last act dragged a little." The New York Times reported, "the second (act) fell flat from the beginning and was a gloomy and tedious failure." According to the St. James's Gazette, "gradually the enthusiasm faded away and the interest of the story began to flag, until at last the plot seemed within an ace of collapsing altogether."

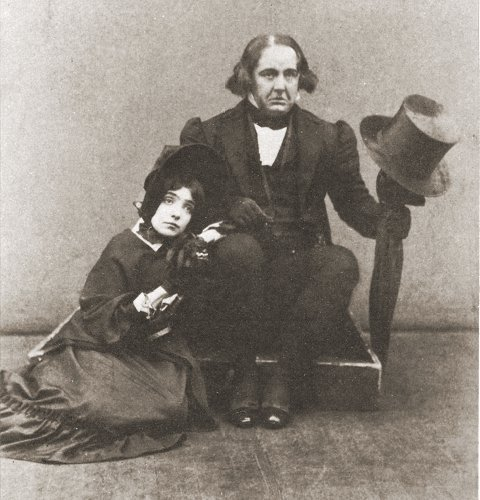
Bond and Barrington: Margaret discloses one of her "odd thoughts" to Despard.

The Era commented, "the libretto as a whole is very weak and loosely constructed." Fun asked, "Could it be possible that we were to have a dull play from the cleverest and most original humorist of the day? Alas! It could – it was." According to the Pall Mall Budget, "the players seemed to be nervous from the start. Miss Braham forgot her lines, and was not in voice. Mr. (George) Grossmith was in the same plight". The Times also criticised Braham, stating that she "acted most charmingly, but sang persistently out of tune". The staging was also criticised: The Times stated, "The ghost scene ... of which preliminary notices and hints of the initiated had led one to expect much, was a very tame affair." The Era thought Sullivan's score "far from being fresh and spontaneous as is his wont".

Not all newspapers were adversely critical. The Sunday Express headlined its review "Another Brilliant Success". The Sunday Times agreed and stated that the work was "received with every demonstration of delight by a distinguished and representative audience." The Observer also praised the piece, though allowing that it "lacks something of the sustained brilliance" of The Mikado. The Daily News applauded the innovation of Sullivan (who conducted, as usual, on the first night), of conducting with a baton tipped with a small incandescent light. Scholar Reginald Allen suggested that the reviews in the Sunday papers may have been better than the others because their critics, facing deadlines (the premiere was on Saturday night, and finished late because of the long interval), may not have stayed to the end. Fun, having disparaged the libretto, said of the music, "Sir Arthur has surpassed himself". The Pall Mall Gazette praised the "charming melodies, fresh and delightful as ever"; The Daily News wrote that "Mr Gilbert retains in all its fulness his unique facility for humorous satire and whimsical topsy-turveydom" and praised Sullivan's "melodic genius which never fails". Lloyd's Weekly Newspaper said, "Sir Arthur Sullivan must be congratulated."

=== Subsequent reviews and reception ===
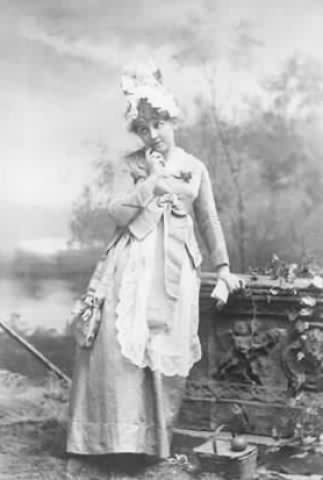
Geraldine Ulmar as Rose in New York

Subsequent reviews, written after Gilbert and Sullivan had renamed the show and made other changes, were generally more favourable. A week after the premiere, the Illustrated London News praised the work, the actors and both Gilbert and, especially, Sullivan: "Sir Arthur Sullivan has eminently succeeded alike in the expression of refined sentiment and comic humour. In the former respect, the charm of graceful melody prevails; while, in the latter, the music of the most grotesque situations is redolent of fun." On 1 February 1887, The Theatre wrote, "There can be no doubt that by its admirable production of Messrs. Gilbert and Sullivan's latest work the Savoy management has scored another of those shining and remunerative successes that its enterprise, intelligence, and good taste have repeatedly achieved – and merited." A week later, The Academy reckoned that Ruddygore (as it was still called in the review) was probably not so good as Patience or The Mikado, nor as "fresh" as H.M.S. Pinafore, but "it is better than ... Princess Ida, the Pirates, and Iolanthe". The Musical Times called the work "one of the most brilliant examples which the associated art of Messrs. Gilbert and Sullivan has brought into existence," and said that Sullivan had "written some of his freshest and most delightful melodies." However, in the view of The Manchester Guardian, reviewing the Manchester premiere in March 1887, "The weakness of his central idea has led Mr Gilbert into extravagance without wit and parody without point."

On 5 February 1887, The New York Times reported the change of name to Ruddigore. "In consequence of the criticisms on the piece, the second act has been changed. The pictures, with the exception of one, no longer come down from their frames. The houses are packed, as they always are in London, but the opinion is universal that the thing will be a worse failure in the provinces and America than Iolanthe." In a letter cabled to The New York Times and printed on 18 February, Richard D'Oyly Carte denied that the piece was a failure, stating that box office receipts were running ahead of the same time period for The Mikado, despite the absence of the ailing Grossmith, who was by then recovering. He acknowledged that there had been "isolated hisses" on the first night because some audience members did not like the reappearance of the ghosts or a reference to the "Supreme Court" (according to D'Oyly Carte, misunderstood as "Supreme Being") but asserted that both objections had been addressed by the removal of the offending material, and that audience reaction had been otherwise enthusiastic. He added, "The theatre is crammed nightly."

The American productions met with mixed success. The demand for tickets for the first night was so great that the management of the Fifth Avenue Theatre sold them by public auction. A "large and brilliant" audience assembled for the New York premiere on 21 February 1887. "After the first half of the first act there was a palpable diminution of interest on the part of the audience, and it must be admitted that there were times during the course of the evening when people were bored." While the critic had praise for many members of the cast and felt the production would improve once the cast was more familiar with the work, the reviewer concluded that "Gilbert and Sullivan have failed." On the other hand, the American tour, beginning in Philadelphia six days later, met with a much more favourable audience reaction. "That the opera is a great success here and another "Mikado" in prospective popularity there can be no question.... The general verdict is that Sullivan never composed more brilliant music, while Gilbert's keen satire and pungent humor is [sic] as brilliant as ever." During the summer of 1886, Braham secretly married J. Duncan Young, previously a principal tenor with the company. In early 1887, shortly into the run of Ruddigore, Braham informed Carte that she was pregnant with her second child, a daughter, who would be born on 6 May. Geraldine Ulmar, the Rose in the New York cast, was summoned to London to take over the role.

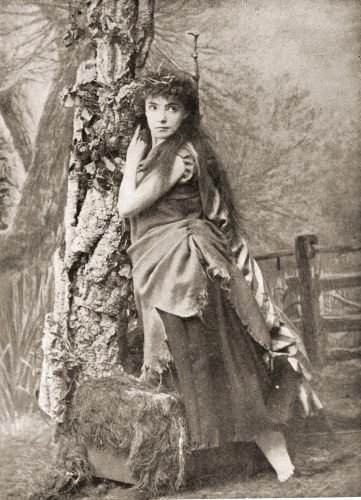
Jessie Bond as Margaret

Gilbert ranked Ruddigore along with The Yeomen of the Guard and Utopia, Limited as one of his three favourite Savoy operas. Later assessments have found much merit in the piece. After it was revived by the D'Oyly Carte Opera Company in 1920, the work remained in their regular repertory, and it has generally been given a place in the regular rotation of other Gilbert and Sullivan repertory companies. By 1920, in a reappraisal of the piece, Samuel Langford wrote in The Manchester Guardian that "the gruesome strain is the real Gilbertian element" but "the opera has abundant charm among its more forbidding qualities". In 1934 Hesketh Pearson rated the libretto among Gilbert's best. In a 1937 review, The Manchester Guardian declared,

It is incomprehensible that Ruddigore should ever have been considered less attractive than the other comic operas in the Savoy series. The libretto gives us Gilbert at his wittiest, and in the music we hear Sullivan not only in his most tuneful vein but also as a master of more subtle rhythms than he commands elsewhere. Moreover, the parody is one that all can enjoy to the full, for here the satire is not pointed at a coterie, nor at this or that æsthetic movement, but at the absurdities of a melodramatic tradition which is nearly as old as the stage itself.

In 1984, Arthur Jacobs rated Ruddigore "One of the weaker of Gilbert's librettos, it was seen (especially after the freshness of invention in The Mikado) to be rather obviously relying on brushed-up ideas.... The plot is supposedly a burlesque of what was 'transpontine' melodrama.... But that brand of melodrama was itself hardly alive enough to be made fun of. As the Weekly Dispatch put it: 'If stage work of the kind caricatured in Ruddygore or The Witch's Curse is not extinct, it is relegated to regions unfrequented by the patrons of Mr D'Oyly Carte's theatre'."

== Analysis of music and text ==
=== Musical content ===
The Sullivan scholar Gervase Hughes characterised Sir Roderic's song "When the night wind howls" as "unquestionably the finest piece of descriptive music that Sullivan ever wrote, worthy of a place beside Schubert's Erlkönig, Wagner's overture to The Flying Dutchman, and well above Saint-Saëns' Danse macabre, all of which are tone-paintings in a similar colour. Although the vocal score gives not a hint of the uncanny brilliance of the orchestration, it demonstrates the sure footholds by which the music in a round dozen bars finds its way from D minor to A flat major and back and the shattering impact of the fortissimo chorus entry at an interrupted cadence on the chord of B flat major. The progressions that follow [represent] an apotheosis of [Sullivan's] matured harmonic resource."

== Versions ==
=== Changes during the initial run ===
After the unfavourable reception that the opera received on opening night, Gilbert and Sullivan made numerous significant cuts and alterations: Sullivan recorded in his diary:

- [23 January 1887]: Gilbert and Carte came. Pow-wow. Several changes and cuts decided on.
- [24 January]: Alterations made in finale [2nd act]: ghosts not brought back to life.
- [25 January]: Long rehearsal for cuts and changes (without band).
- [30 January] Wrote and scored new song (second act) for Grossmith.
- [31 January]: Busy all day. Went to American consulate to sign agreement for American "Ruddygore". Finished score of new finale

So far as I can see, there is only one strong and serious objection to "Ruddygore", and that is its hideous and repulsive title. What could possibly have incited Mr. W. S. Gilbert and Sir Arthur Sullivan to court prejudice and provoke opposition by giving a gratuitously false impression to their most melodious and amusing work?
Review from The Illustrated London News.

Gilbert and Sullivan made the following changes:

- The initial title, Ruddygore, was changed: because of claims that "ruddy" was too similar to the then-taboo curse word "bloody", it was shortly changed to Ruddigore. Gilbert's response to being told they meant the same thing was: "Not at all, for that would mean that if I said that I admired your ruddy countenance, which I do, I would be saying that I liked your bloody cheek, which I don't."
- "I once was as meek" (No. 16) originally had two verses. In the cut second verse, Robin's servant says that he has changed his name from Adam Goodheart to Gideon Crawle since he is now a "bad Bart.'s steward." Old Adam is then referred to as "Gideon Crawle" or "Gideon" for the rest of Act II. After the cut, he remained Old Adam throughout, except for a single erroneous reference ("Gideon Crawle, it won't do!") which persisted in many librettos well into the 20th century.
- "In bygone days" (No. 18) was cut from two verses to one.
- "Painted emblems of a race" (No. 19) originally had two extra passages, including a March of the Ghosts after they descend from their frames, both of which were cut. (This alteration may have occurred before the premiere.) The dialogue between Robin and the ghosts afterwards was also shortened.
- The patter song after the recitative "Away, remorse!" (No. 21a) was changed from "For thirty-five years I've been sober and wary" to "Henceforth all the crimes that I find in the Times". The rewriting of the song was prompted by a letter from Gilbert to Sullivan dated 23 January 1887: "I can't help thinking that the second act would be greatly improved if the recitation before Grossmith's song were omitted and the song re-set to an air that would admit of his singing it desperately – almost in a passion, the torrent of which would take him off the stage at the end. After a long and solemn ghost scene, I fancy a lachrymose song is quite out of place".
- Despard's and Margaret's stated (in No. 22) place of employment was changed from "a Sunday School" to "a National School".
- The dialogue scene among Robin, Despard and Margaret before the patter trio (No. 23) was shortened.
- The dialogue scene before "There grew a little flower" (No. 25) was considerably shortened; the first version exploring the topsy-turvy idea that if Sir Roderic and Dame Hannah were married, her husband would be a ghost, and she would therefore be a wife and a widow at the same time (this concept was recycled in The Grand Duke). Roderic originally entered through a trap door in the floor, where red flames could be seen shooting around him. This was changed to an entrance from the picture frame.
- The second revivification of the ghosts was dropped, with only Roderic being revived. Somewhat implausibly, this required the "chorus of Bucks and Blades" from Act I to be present at the castle at the end of Act II, to provide a four-part chorus for the finale.
- The finale was revised and extended, ending with a common-time reworking of "Oh happy the lily", rather than a straight reprise as previously.

The original vocal score, published in March 1887, represented this revised version of the musical text. A 1987 recording by the New Sadler's Wells Opera, for which David Russell Hulme was adviser, restored most of the surviving material from the first-night version, including "For thirty-five years I've been sober and wary", as well as the extra music from the ghost scene. The recording and the production were based in part on Hulme's research, which also led to the 2000 Oxford University Press edition of the Ruddigore score, in which the music for some passages was published for the first time.

=== Revisions in the 1920s ===
William Bridges-Adams' Act II set design for the 1921 revival.

Overture
Geoffrey Toye's overture, conducted by Harry Norris, 1924.

Ruddigore was not revived professionally during the authors' lifetimes. When it received its first professional revival in December 1920 in Glasgow – and then in London, in October 1921 – the D'Oyly Carte Opera Company made a number of further cuts and changes that were incorporated in scores and used in subsequent D'Oyly Carte productions and recordings. David Russell Hulme, editor of the Oxford University Press 2000 scholarly edition of the score, has attributed the cuts and other changes to the music principally to Harry Norris, musical director of the D'Oyly Carte at the time of the Glasgow revival, and the modifications to the opera's orchestration, as well as the new overture, to Geoffrey Toye. He concluded that some lesser changes may have been made by Malcolm Sargent, but in a few cases Hulme was uncertain as to which conductor was responsible for which change.

The most conspicuous changes were as follows:

- Geoffrey Toye, the D'Oyly Carte musical director for the first London revival in 1921, supplied a new overture to replace the original overture arranged by Hamilton Clarke.
- The playoffs to the Act I numbers "Sir Rupert Murgatroyd" (No. 2) and "If somebody there chanced to be" (No. 3) were shortened.
- In the Act I song "My boy, you may take it from me" (No. 7), the repetitions of the introduction were omitted, and only the last repeat with Richard was retained.
- The Act I duet "The battle's roar is over" (No. 8) was cut.
- Some cuts were made within the Act I finale (No. 15) to shorten transitions between sections.
- Drum rolls and other orchestral effects were added to the ghost scene in Act II (Nos. 19–20)
- The Act II recitative and patter song "Away, remorse" ... "Henceforth all the crimes" (No. 21a) was cut.
- The "Melodrame" (No. 24) was cut.
- The Act II finale was replaced. The finale as composed and revised by Sullivan had consisted of "When a man has been a naughty baronet", plus a modified reprise of "Oh, happy the lily" in 4/4 time. The replacement (ironically rather closer to Sullivan's discarded original) was a straight reprise of "Oh, happy the lily" in the form it had taken in the Act I finale, in 9/8 time.

The standard Chappell vocal score was revised in the late 1920s to reflect these changes, except that the "Melodrame" and "The battle's roar is over" continued to be printed. The G. Schirmer vocal score published in America agreed with the revised Chappell score, except that it also included Robin's Act II recitative and patter song "Henceforth all the crimes" and both versions of the Act II finale. The publication of the Oxford University Press edition in 2000 made it easier to restore passages deleted from the opera. Due to the many different editions available and the work's complex textual history, there is no standard performing version of Ruddigore. Comparing the two extant overtures, Gervase Hughes wrote:

[T]he original overture to Ruddigore ... is a crude "selection" hardly redeemed by its spirited ending. The final cadence is by no means typical of Sullivan. In this overture a "double chorus" ... is taken complete from the opera – an unsatisfactory move because it vitiates its effect in the proper place. Nor is the orchestration of the passage particularly skilful. ... When Ruddigore was revived after some thirty-four years this jumble was found unsuitable ... and a new overture (which has been used ever since) was written by Geoffrey Toye. No precedents were followed and there is nothing Sullivanesque about it except the actual tunes; if one of them is momentarily developed in a manner that suggests a haunted ballroom rather than a haunted picture-gallery there is no great harm in that.

== Productions ==
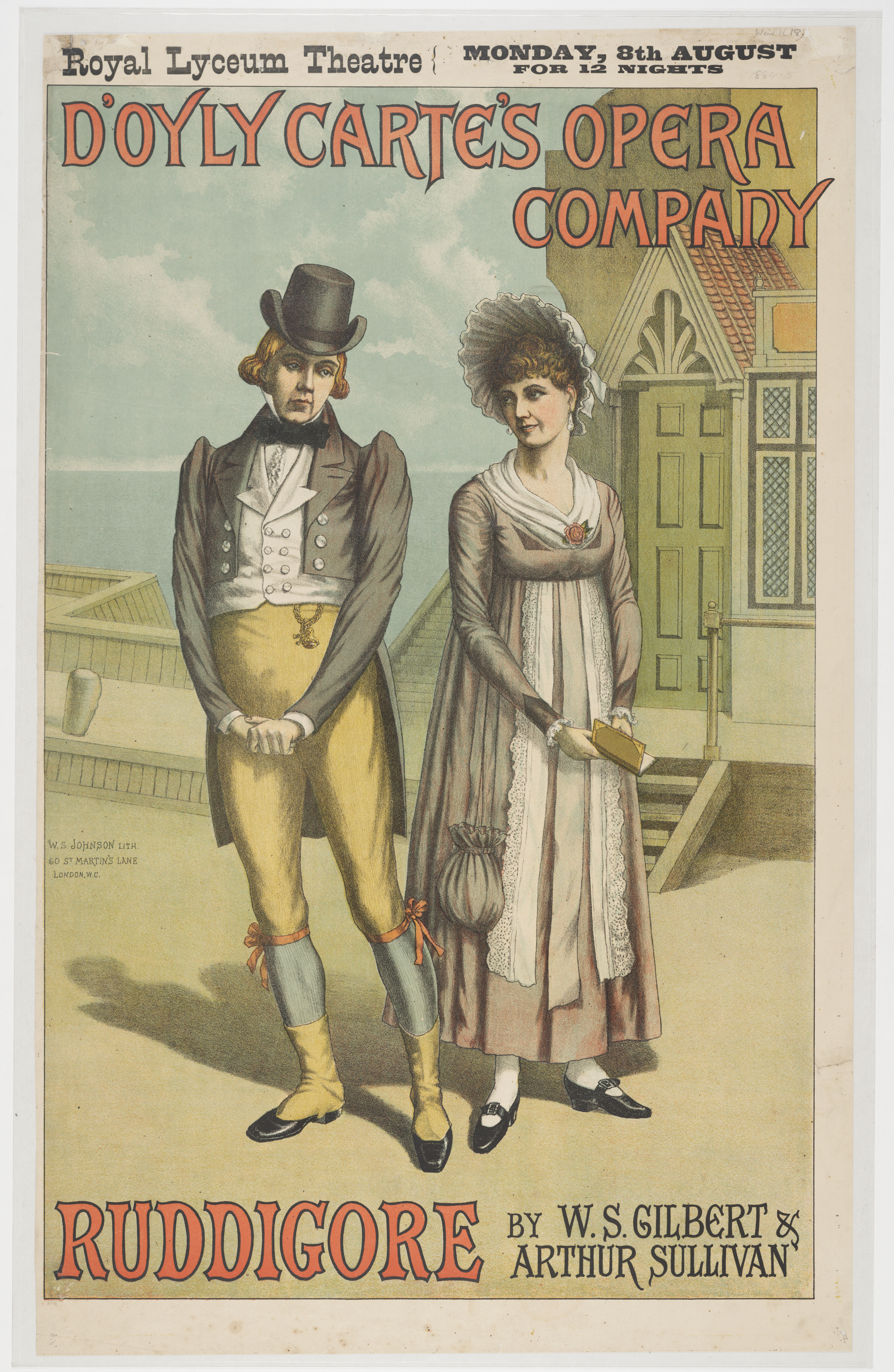
Poster from 1887, with Rose and Robin

In contrast to its predecessor, The Mikado, Ruddigore had a comparatively short original run of 288 performances. The provincial tour was very brief, closing by early June 1887. Gilbert designed the ladies' and principals' costumes himself, while C. Wilhelm created the Ancestors' costumes. The set was by Hawes Craven. Six portraits of the ancestors that appeared in Act II of the original London production have survived and are on display at Normansfield Hospital Entertainment Hall, southwest London. A production in New York with D'Oyly Carte personnel ran for 53 performances. The opera was not revived during Gilbert and Sullivan's lifetimes.

The first revival was in December 1920 in Glasgow, and the first London revival was the following year. The opera was cut and heavily revised, including a new overture and a new second-act finale. The revival was a success, and from that point on, Ruddigore was a permanent fixture in the D'Oyly Carte repertory until its closure in 1982. New costumes were designed by Percy Anderson in 1927. It was included in every season until the winter of 1940–41, when the scenery and costumes (along with those of three other operas) were destroyed in enemy action. In Australia, no authorised production of Ruddigore was seen until 23 June 1927, at the Theatre Royal, Adelaide, produced by the J. C. Williamson company. A new D'Oyly Carte production debuted on 1 November 1948, with new costumes and an Act II set designed by Peter Goffin. From then on, it was played in every season through 1976–77, aside from 1962–63 (a season that included a lengthy overseas tour). New touring sets were designed by Goffin in 1957. In the late 1970s, the Company started to play a reduced repertory. Ruddigore was included in the 1976–77 tour, then for five months in 1978–1979; and finally in 1981–82.

In 1987, the New Sadler's Wells Opera produced Ruddigore using a new edition of the text that restored many of the passages that prior productions had cut. Among recent professional productions, the Gilbert and Sullivan Opera Company has mounted the opera at the Buxton Opera House, and both Britain's Opera North and America's New York Gilbert and Sullivan Players mounted well-regarded stagings in 2010. Opera North revived its production in 2011 and 2012.

The following table shows the history of the D'Oyly Carte productions in Gilbert's lifetime:

Theatre	Opening date	Closing date	Perfs.	Details
Savoy Theatre	22 January 1887	5 November 1887	288	First London run.
Fifth Avenue Theatre, New York	21 February 1887	9 April 1887	53	Authorised American production.

== Historical casting ==
The following tables show the casts of the principal original productions and D'Oyly Carte Opera Company touring repertory at approximately 10-year intervals through to the company's 1982 closure:

Role	Savoy Theatre 1887	Fifth Avenue 1887	D'Oyly Carte 1920 Tour	D'Oyly Carte 1930 Tour	D'Oyly Carte 1939 Tour
Robin Oakapple	George Grossmith	George Thorne	Henry Lytton	Henry Lytton	Martyn Green
Richard Dauntless	Durward Lely	Courtice Pounds	Derek Oldham	Charles Goulding	John Dean
Sir Despard	Rutland Barrington	Fred Billington	Leo Sheffield	Sydney Granville	Sydney Granville
Old Adam	Rudolph Lewis	Leo Kloss	Douglas Kirke	Joseph Griffin	L. Radley Flynn
Sir Roderic	Richard Temple	Frederick Federici	Darrell Fancourt	Darrell Fancourt	Darrell Fancourt
Rose Maybud	Leonora Braham	Geraldine Ulmar	Sylvia Cecil	Sylvia Cecil	Margery Abbott
Mad Margaret	Jessie Bond	Kate Forster	Catherine Ferguson	Nellie Briercliffe	Marjorie Eyre
Dame Hannah	Rosina Brandram	Elsie Cameron	Bertha Lewis	Bertha Lewis	Evelyn Gardiner
Zorah	Josephine Findlay	Aida Jenoure	Marion Brignal	Sybil Gordon	Marjorie Flinn
Ruth	Miss Lindsay	Miss Murray/Amy Augarde	Mary Athol	Murielle Barron	Maysie Dean

Role	D'Oyly Carte 1948 Tour	D'Oyly Carte 1958 Tour	D'Oyly Carte 1966 Tour	D'Oyly Carte 1975 Tour	D'Oyly Carte 1982 Tour
Robin Oakapple	Martyn Green	Peter Pratt	John Reed	John Reed	Peter Lyon
Richard Dauntless	Leonard Osborn	Leonard Osborn	David Palmer	Meston Reid	Meston Reid
Sir Despard	Richard Watson	Kenneth Sandford	Kenneth Sandford	Kenneth Sandford	Kenneth Sandford
Old Adam	L. Radley Flynn	John Banks	George Cook	Jon Ellison	Michael Buchan
Sir Roderic	Darrell Fancourt	Donald Adams	Donald Adams	John Ayldon	John Ayldon
Rose Maybud	Margaret Mitchell	Jean Barrington	Ann Hood	Julia Goss	Jill Washington
Mad Margaret	Pauline Howard	Joyce Wright	Peggy Ann Jones	Judi Merri	Lorraine Daniels
Dame Hannah	Ella Halman	Ann Drummond-Grant	Christene Palmer	Lyndsie Holland	Patricia Leonard
Zorah	Muriel Harding	Mary Sansom	Jennifer Marks	Anne Egglestone	Jane Stanford
Ruth	Joyce Wright	Beryl Dixon	Pauline Wales	Marjorie Williams	Helene Witcombe

== Recordings ==
The four D'Oyly Carte Opera Company recordings (1924, 1931, 1950, 1962) substantially reflect the 1920s cuts and alterations, although they differ in some details. None of these four recordings include Robin's Act II recitative and patter song. There is no commercial recording of Ruddigore as Gilbert and Sullivan left it, but the 1987 New Sadler's Wells recording largely presents the opera with the materials that were included on its first night.

The Gilbert and Sullivan Discography judges that the best commercial recording is the New Sadler's Wells disc and that, of those by the D'Oyly Carte Opera Company, the 1924 and 1962 recordings are best. It also asserts that the Brent Walker video of Ruddigore is one of the stronger entries in that series. More recent professional productions have been recorded on video by the International Gilbert and Sullivan Festival.

Selected recordings

- 1924 D'Oyly Carte – Conductor: Harry Norris
- 1931 D'Oyly Carte – Conductor: Malcolm Sargent
- 1950 D'Oyly Carte – Conductor: Isidore Godfrey
- 1962 D'Oyly Carte – Orchestra of the Royal Opera, Conductor: Isidore Godfrey
- 1963 Glyndebourne Festival Chorus, Pro Arte Orchestra, Conductor: Malcolm Sargent
- 1967 Halas and Batchelor Films (animation; abridged) – D'Oyly Carte, Royal Philharmonic Orchestra, Conductor: James Walker
- 1982 Brent Walker Productions (video) – Ambrosian Opera Chorus, London Symphony Orchestra, Conductor: Alexander Faris; Stage Director: Christopher Renshaw
- 1987 New Sadler's Wells – Conductor: Simon Phipps

== Adaptations and references in literature and culture ==
Adaptations of the opera have included the following.

- The Ghosts of Ruddigore by Opera della Luna
- Ruddy George, or Robin Redbreast, a burlesque with words by H.G.F. Taylor and music by Percy Reeve; it premiered at Toole's Theatre on 26 March 1887 and ran for about 36 performances.

References in literature have included several novels in which the setting of the story involved a production of Ruddigore, such as Murder and Sullivan by Sara Hoskinson Frommer (1997) and Ruddy Gore by Kerry Greenwood (2004; the 7th Phryne Fisher book). The Ghosts' High Noon by John Dickson Carr (1969) was named for the song of the same name in Ruddigore. In "Runaround", a story from Isaac Asimov's I, Robot, a robot in a state similar to drunkenness sings snippets of "There Grew a Little Flower". In chapter 12 of John Myers Myers' novel Silverlock Sir Despard appears and admits that he fakes his evil acts; the locals are so used to this that he needs to pay the girls extra to scream when abducted.

Plot elements from G&S operas entered subsequent musicals; for example, 1937's Me and My Girl features a portrait gallery of ancestors that, like the portraits in Ruddigore, come alive to remind their descendant of his duty. The "Matter Patter" trio is used (with some changed lyrics) in Papp's Broadway production of The Pirates of Penzance, and the tune of the song is used as "The Speed Test" in the musical Thoroughly Modern Millie. It is also sung in a season 5 episode of Spitting Image where Labour leader Neil Kinnock is portrayed singing a self-parody to the tune. The same song is pastiched in the documentary film Bronies: The Extremely Unexpected Adult Fans of My Little Pony. In the Doctor Who Big Finish Productions audio, Doctor Who and the Pirates, songs from Ruddigore and other G&S operas are parodied.

Ruddigore is mentioned in the law case of Banks v. District of Columbia Dep't of Consumer & Regulatory Affairs, 634 A.2d 433, 441 fn. 1 (D.C. 1993), which cites Ruddigore's admonition to "blow your own trumpet". A production of "Ruddigore" is the main plot point in Miss Fisher's Murder Mysteries, Season 1 Episode 6, "Ruddy Gore", based on the Phryne Fisher novel of the same name. The stars of the opera are being killed off in an effort to bankrupt the production company.
