= Witcover =

Witcover is a surname. Notable people with the surname include:

- Hyman Witcover (1871–1936), American architect
- Jules Witcover (1927–2025), American journalist, author, and columnist
- Walt Witcover (1924–2013), American actor, director, and acting teacher
