= Cox and Box =

English comic opera

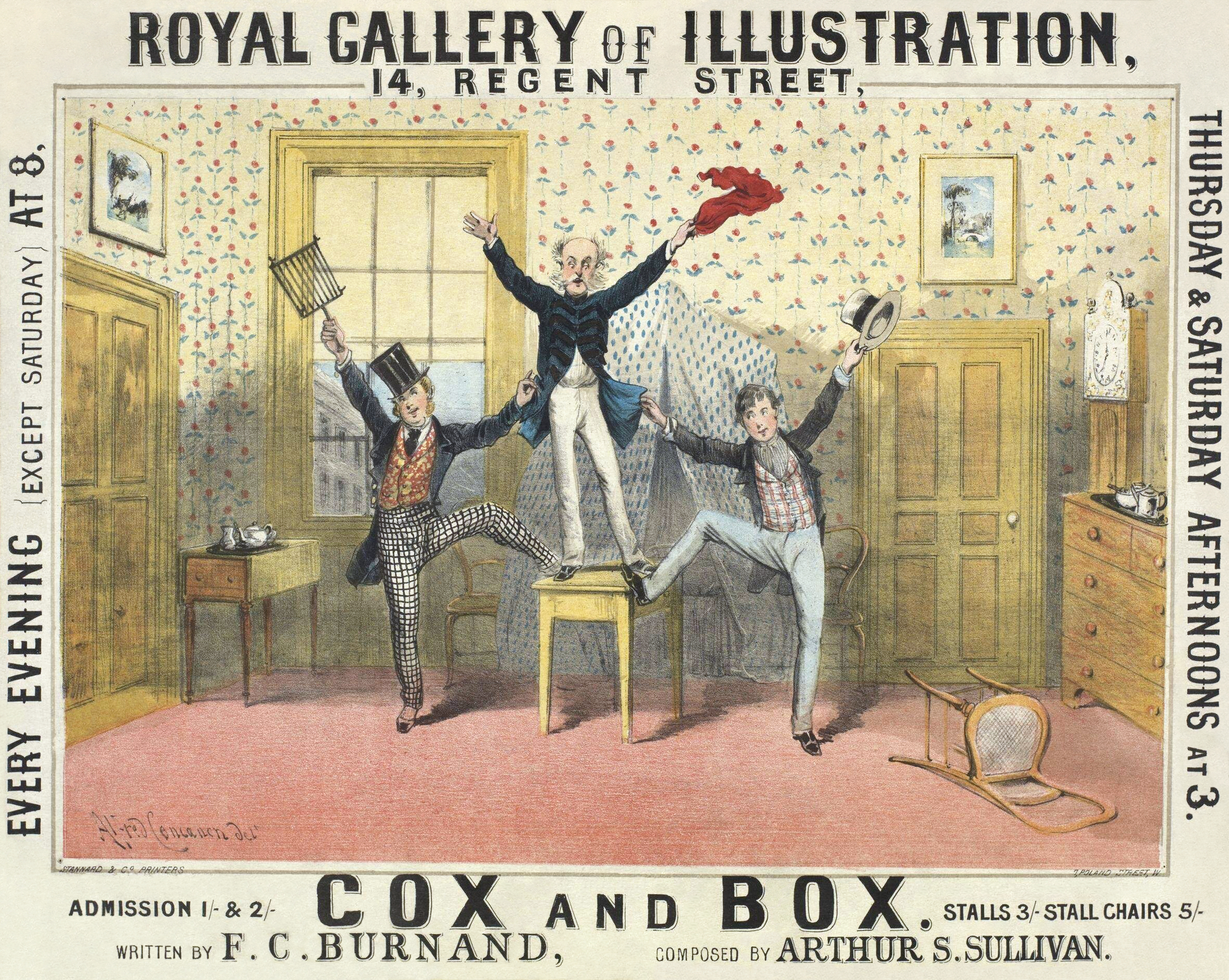
Poster for the 1869 production at the Royal Gallery of Illustration

Cox and Box; or, The Long-Lost Brothers, is a one-act comic opera with a libretto by F. C. Burnand and music by Arthur Sullivan, based on the 1847 farce Box and Cox by John Maddison Morton. It was Sullivan's first successful comic opera. The story concerns a landlord who lets a room to two lodgers, one who works at night and one who works during the day. When one of them has the day off, they meet each other in the room and tempers flare. Sullivan wrote this piece five years before his first opera with W. S. Gilbert, Thespis.

The piece premiered in 1866 and was seen a few times at charity benefits in 1867. Once given a professional production in 1869, it became popular, running for 264 performances and enjoying many revivals and further charity performances. During the 20th century, it was frequently played by the D'Oyly Carte Opera Company in an abridged version, as a curtain raiser for the shorter Gilbert and Sullivan operas. It has been played by numerous professional and amateur companies throughout the world and continues to be frequently produced.

== Background ==
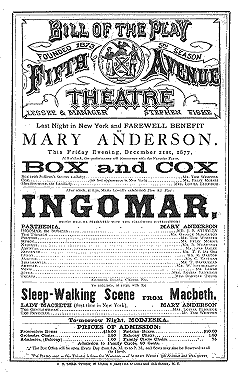
Playbill from a New York production of Box and Cox

The Moray Minstrels were an informal gathering of notable men involved in London society and the arts, including painters, actors and writers, who were mostly amateur musicians. They would meet for musical evenings at Moray Lodge, in Kensington, the home of Arthur James Lewis (1824–1901), a haberdasher and silk merchant (of the firm Lewis & Allenby), who married the actress Kate Terry in 1867. The Minstrels would discuss the arts, smoke and sing part-songs and other popular music at monthly gatherings of more than 150 lovers of the arts; their conductor was John Foster. Foster, as well as the dramatist F. C. Burnand and many other members were friendly with young Arthur Sullivan, who joined the group. On one occasion in early 1865, they heard a performance of Offenbach's short two-man operetta Les deux aveugles ("The Two Blind Men"). After seeing another operetta at Moray Lodge the following winter, Burnand asked Sullivan to collaborate on a new piece to be performed for the Minstrels.

Burnand adapted the libretto for this "triumviretta" from John Maddison Morton's famous farce, Box and Cox, which had premiered in London in 1847, starring J. B. Buckstone. The text follows Morton's play closely, differing in only two notable respects. First, in the play the protagonists lodge with Mrs Bouncer; in Burnand's version the character is Sergeant Bouncer. (Note: In 1858, an Italian, Felice Orsini, attempted to assassinate the French Emperor Napoleon III with a bomb. The Emperor was unhurt. Orsini had planned the attempt in England, and French officers petitioned Napoleon III to invade Britain. The British government took this threat seriously enough that, in 1859 a Volunteer Corps. was formed for the purpose of helping to repel any invasion. Edmund Yates, a novelist and playwright, recalled: "In [the Volunteer] movement it would have been unpardonable if the Government officials had not been early and largely represented, and the Civil Service Rifle Regiment, with the Prince of Wales for its honorary colonel ... and with two Post Office companies in its ranks, was speedily enrolled, having Somerset House for its headquarters." When Burnand substituted the character of Sergeant Bouncer for Mrs Bouncer in 1866, he made him a former military volunteer, when memories of the French invasion scare of 1859 would have been fresh in the minds of the theatre-going public.) This change was necessitated by the intention of performing the piece for the all-male gathering of the Moray Minstrels. Secondly, Burnand wrote original lyrics to be set to music by the 24-year-old Sullivan. The date and venue of the first performance was much disputed, starting in 1890, in duelling letters to The World, with Burnand and Lewis each claiming to have hosted it. Andrew Lamb has concluded that the run-through at Burnand's home on 23 May 1866, without costumes or sets, was a rehearsal before a small group of invited friends, followed by the first performance at Lewis's home on 26 May 1866. (Note: Although performances of the Moray Minstrels were normally from January to April only, Lamb and Reginald Allen state that this additional performance was specially given in May.) A printed programme dated 23 May later surfaced, suggesting more than a mere rehearsal, but the composer himself supported the later date, writing to The World: "I feel bound to say that Burnand's version came upon me with the freshness of a novel. My own recollection of the business is perfectly distinct". John Foster, who played Bouncer in the production, (Note: Foster conducted the Moray Minstrels for over 40 years. The name of the first Sergeant Bouncer has sometimes been given as "John Forster", who was a writer for Punch, but this seems to be following an error made by Burnand in early correspondence describing the first performance of Cox and Box: Foster, Lewis and others identify Foster, not Forster, as the first Sergeant Bouncer.) called the run-through at Burnand's house a rehearsal. The original cast also included George du Maurier as Box and Harold Power as Cox, with Sullivan improvising the accompaniment at the piano.

Another performance at Moray Lodge took place eleven months later on 26 April 1867. This was followed by the first public performance, which was given as part of a charity benefit by the Moray Minstrels (along with Kate, Florence and Ellen Terry and others) for the widow and children of C. H. Bennett, on 11 May 1867 at the Adelphi Theatre, with du Maurier as Box, Quintin Twiss as Cox and Arthur Cecil as Bouncer, performing as an amateur under his birth name, Arthur Blunt. A review in The Times commented that Burnand had adapted Morton's libretto well, and that Sullivan's music was "full of sparking tune and real comic humour". (Note: The Times reviewed the performance: "The entertainments began somewhat merrily, the occasion considered, with what Mr. F. C. Burnand, the author, entitles The Interpolated Libretto of a new Triumviretta, but which is simply Mr. Maddison Morton's Box and Cox, adapted to the lyric stage, under the transposed name of Cox and Box. This is not an occasion for criticism; nevertheless, we feel compelled to say that Mr. Burnand has executed his task so well, and that Mr. Arthur S. Sullivan, our most rising composer, has written music for it so full of sparking tune and real comic humour that we cannot but believe that this musical version of a widely popular farce would have a genuine success if produced on the recognized stage by recognized professional players. It is quite as stirring and lively as anything by M. Offenbach, with the extra advantage of being the work of a cultivated musician, who under any temptation would scorn to write ungrammatically even if he could. … The whole passed off amid roars of laughter, and a special call was made for Mr. Sullivan, the musical director of the day, who bowed from his place in the orchestra. The piece was preceded by Auber's overture to Le Philtre. Mr. Sullivan should compose an overture himself, and so complete his admirable operetta.") The rest of the evening's entertainment included a musicale by the Moray Minstrels, the play A Wolf in Sheep's Clothing and Les deux aveugles. The opera was heard with a full orchestra for the first time on that occasion, with Sullivan completing the orchestration a matter of hours before the first rehearsal. The Musical World praised both author and composer, suggesting that the piece would gain success if presented professionally. It was repeated on 18 May 1867 at the Royal Gallery of Illustration in Regent Street. The critic for the magazine Fun, W. S. Gilbert, wrote of the 11 May performance:

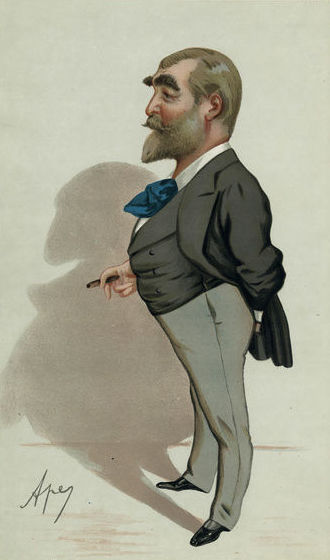
Drawing of Burnand in Vanity Fair

Mr. Burnand's version of Box and Cox ... is capitally written, and Mr. Sullivan's music is charming throughout. The faults of the piece, as it stands, are twain. Firstly: Mr. Burnand should have operatized the whole farce, condensing it, at the same time, into the smallest compass, consistent with an intelligible reading of the plot. ... Secondly, Mr. Sullivan's music is, in many places, of too high a class for the grotesquely absurd plot to which it is wedded. It is very funny, here and there, and grand or graceful where it is not funny; but the grand and the graceful have, we think, too large a share of the honours to themselves. The music was capitally sung by Messrs. Du Maurier, Quintin, and Blunt (Note: Gilbert noted as the reason for condensing the dialogue and musicalising the rest, that: "Mr. Morton's dialogue can only be properly given by Messrs. Buckstone and Compton, and in the mouths of any other actors it is, to those who have seen Messrs. Buckstone and Compton in the parts (and who has not?) a bore.")

At yet another charity performance, at the Theatre Royal, Manchester, on 29 July 1867, the overture was heard for the first time. The autograph full score is inscribed, Ouverture à la Triumvirette musicale 'Cox et Boxe' et 'Bouncer' composée par Arthur S. Sullivan, Paris, 23 Juillet 1867. Hotel Meurice. The duet "Stay, Bouncer, stay!" was probably first heard in this revival.

There were discussions about an 1867 professional production under the management of Thomas German Reed, but instead Reed commissioned Sullivan and Burnand to write a two-act comic opera, The Contrabandista, which was less well received. Cox and Box had its first professional production under Reed's management, at the Royal Gallery of Illustration, opening on Easter Monday, 29 March 1869, with Gilbert and Frederic Clay's No Cards preceding it on the bill. The occasion marked the professional debut of Arthur Cecil, who played Box. German Reed played Cox and F. Seymour played Bouncer. Cox and Box ran until 20 March 1870, a total of 264 performances, with a further 23 performances on tour. The production was a hit, although critics lamented the loss of Sullivan's orchestration (the Gallery of Illustration was too small for an orchestra): "The operetta loses something by the substitution ... of a piano and harmonium accompaniment for the orchestral parts which Mr. Sullivan knows so well how to write; but the music is nevertheless welcome in any shape."

== Subsequent productions ==
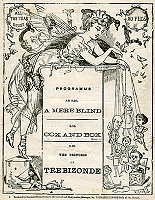
1874 Gaiety production starring Fred Sullivan as Cox

Cox and Box quickly became a Victorian staple, with additional productions in Manchester in 1869 and on tour in 1871 (conducted by Richard D'Oyly Carte, with the composer's brother Fred playing Cox), at London's Alhambra Theatre in 1871, with Fred as Cox, and at the Gaiety Theatre in 1872, 1873, and 1874 (the last of these again starring Fred as Cox and Cecil as Box), and Manchester again in 1874 (paired with The Contrabandista). There were also numerous charity performances beginning in 1867, including two at the Gaiety during the run of Thespis, and another in Switzerland in 1879 with Sullivan himself as Cox and Cecil as Box. Sullivan sometimes accompanied these performances. The cast for a performance at the Gaiety in 1880 included Cecil as Box, George Grossmith as Cox and Corney Grain as Bouncer. The first documented American production opened on 14 April 1879 at the Standard Theatre, in New York, as a curtain raiser to a "pirated" production of H.M.S. Pinafore. In an 1884 production at the Court Theatre, the piece played together with Gilbert's Dan'l Druce, Blacksmith (but later in the year with other pieces), with Richard Temple as Cox, Cecil as Box, and Furneaux Cook as Bouncer. This production was revived in 1888, with Cecil, Eric Lewis and William Lugg playing Box, Cox and Bouncer.

The first D'Oyly Carte Opera Company performance of the piece was on 31 December 1894, to accompany another Sullivan–Burnand opera, The Chieftain, which had opened on 12 December at the Savoy Theatre. (Note: The fashion in the late Victorian era was to present long evenings in the theatre, and so D'Oyly Carte preceded his full-length pieces with curtain raisers.) For this production Sullivan cut the "Sixes" duet and verses from several other numbers, and dialogue cuts were also made. Temple played Bouncer and Scott Russell was Cox. It then was played by several D'Oyly Carte touring companies in 1895 and 1896. In 1900, the piece was presented at the Coronet Theatre with Courtice Pounds as Box. In 1921, Rupert D'Oyly Carte introduced Cox and Box as a curtain raiser to The Sorcerer, with additional cuts prepared by J. M. Gordon and Harry Norris. This slimmed-down "Savoy Version" remained in the company's repertory as curtain raiser for the shorter Savoy Operas. By the 1960s, Cox and Box was the usual companion piece to The Pirates of Penzance. It received its final D'Oyly Carte performance on 16 February 1977.

Many amateur theatre companies have also staged Cox and Box – either alone or together with one of the shorter Savoy Operas. In recent years, after the rediscovery of the one-act Sullivan and B. C. Stephenson opera, The Zoo, Cox and Box has sometimes been presented as part of an evening of the three Sullivan one-act operas, sharing a bill with The Zoo and Trial by Jury.

== Roles ==
- James John Cox, A Journeyman Hatter (baritone)
- John James Box, A Journeyman Printer (tenor)
- Sergeant Bouncer, Late of the Dampshire Yeomanry, with military reminiscences (Baritone, later bass-baritone) [See "Versions" below]

== Synopsis ==
Note: The following synopsis describes the original version. For other versions, see the discussion below.

1921 London production

After a brisk overture, the scene opens on a room with a bed, a chest of drawers, a table and chairs, a fireplace, and three doors. Cox is rushing to dress for the day. His landlord, Sergeant Bouncer, helps him get ready, while Cox complains about an uncomfortable pillow and an excessively short haircut, which makes him look like as though he is in the army. Any mention of the army sends Bouncer into a reverie about his own military career. The irritated Cox goes into his dressing room, while Bouncer sings a mock-Handelian aria about his days in the militia, ending with his favourite catch-phrase, "Rataplan! Rataplan!" Cox asks Bouncer why the room always reeks of tobacco smoke. Bouncer suggests that it must be from the tenant in the attic, but Cox observes that smoke always travels up, not down. Cox also wonders why his supplies of coals, matches, candles, tea, sugar, etc., seem to be disappearing. Bouncer suggests it was the cat. When Cox will not accept this explanation, Bouncer launches into another reprise of "Rataplan! Rataplan!" Cox, at last, is late for work and leaves without resolving the mystery.

Left on his own, Bouncer admits that Cox has left in the nick of time, for the room is let to two lodgers, neither of whom knows about the other. Cox, a hatter, works all day; Box, a printer, works all night; so they never come in contact, except that they occasionally pass on the staircase. Bouncer hurriedly re-arranges the room, hiding Cox's possessions and putting out Box's.

Box enters, after a brief offstage altercation with Cox on the staircase. After dismissing Bouncer, he takes out a bread roll, lights the fire, and puts a rasher of bacon on the gridiron. Overcome with exhaustion, he lies down on the bed for a catnap. Cox re-enters, having unexpectedly secured a day off from his employer. He is delighted to find a roll on the table, but surprised to find the fire already lit. Assuming that Bouncer has been using the room in his absence, he takes the bacon off the gridiron, replaces it with a mutton chop, and heads off to his dressing room to retrieve his breakfast utensils.

The slam of Cox's dressing room door awakens Box, who suddenly remembers his bacon. When he sees a mutton chop on the gridiron, he assumes it is Bouncer's, and throws it out the window, hitting a pedestrian outside. He once again puts the bacon on the fire, and goes to his dressing room to retrieve his breakfast utensils. The slam of Box's dressing room door sends Cox scurrying back in, assuming it is the sound of someone knocking. Seeing the bacon on the gridiron once again, he tosses it out the window, hitting the pedestrian for a second time.

Box re-enters from his dressing room, and they confront each other for the first time. Each orders the other to leave. Cox produces his receipt for rent, to prove the room is his, and Box does likewise. Realising they have been duped, they call for Bouncer, who arrives and promptly tries to change the subject with yet another reprise of "Rataplan! Rataplan!" Finally cornered, he admits that the room belongs to both of them, but he says that he will have his little back second floor room ready later the same day. Both lodgers say they will take it, which Bouncer quickly points out makes no sense whatsoever. He leaves them to decide which will vacate the current room. Each suggests the other should leave, but neither will budge. Finally, they realise that it is all Bouncer's fault, and they may as well be friends. They serenade each other on the guitar.

In the course of conversation, Cox admits he has a fiancée, but as she is the proprietor of bathing machines some distance away, she is unlikely to make an appearance. Box says that he is neither single nor married nor widowed, but has been "defunct for the last three years." Cox admits that he would not mind being defunct himself, if it would allow him to escape from unwanted matrimony. Box explains that he was in exactly the same predicament several years ago. On the eve of marriage, he left his possessions at the edge of a cliff with a suicide note. Everyone assumed he had jumped, and so he was free of his intended bride, Penelope Ann. At the mention of that name, Cox realises that his present intended is the same fiancée whom Box had eluded. Cox now declares that he will restore Box to Penelope Ann, while Box says that he would not dream of taking her away from Cox.

Unable to resolve the matter, they at first suggest duelling, but decide on a gentler solution. At first, they throw dice, but each man has a trick die that only throws sixes. Then they try tossing coins, but each one keeps throwing only "heads". At last, Bouncer arrives with a letter from Margate, which they assume must be from Penelope Ann. However, the letter informs them that Penelope Ann was lost in a sailing accident and has left her entire estate to "my intended husband." The two men try to resolve which of them is the beneficiary, but Bouncer arrives with a second letter, informing them that Penelope Ann survived after all, and will be arriving later that day.

They both try to leave, but Bouncer arrives with a third letter: "Being convinced that our feelings, like our ages, do not reciprocate, I hasten to apprise you of my immediate union with Mr. Knox." They rejoice that Penelope Ann is out of the way. Suddenly, Box observes that Cox must surely be his long-lost brother, and Cox says that he was about to make the same observation: Box asks if Cox has a strawberry mark on his left arm. Cox replies that he does not. That settles it: they are long-lost brothers. In a brief finale, they agree that they will remain in the room for good, with Bouncer adding a "Rataplan!" reprise. The curtain falls on general rejoicing.

== Musical numbers ==
1. Overture
2. Song, "Rataplan" (Bouncer)
3. Duet, "Stay, Bouncer, Stay" (Cox, Bouncer)
4. Lullaby, "Hush-a-bye, Bacon" (Box) (Note: In 1869, Sullivan recycled the melody to this lullaby as a parlour ballad, "Birds in the Night", with words by Lionel H. Lewin. Sullivan also wrote a piano piece, called "Berceuse", using the musical theme of the song as well as additional material. It is published as an appendix to the R. Clyde edition of Cox and Box.)
5. Song and Dance, "My Master is Punctual" (Cox)
6. Trio, "Who are You, Sir?" (Box, Cox, Bouncer)
7. Serenade, "The Buttercup" (Box, Cox)
8. Romance, "Not Long Ago" (Box, with Cox)
9. Gambling Duet, "Sixes!" (Box, Cox)
10. Finale, "My Hand upon It" (Box, Cox, Bouncer)

== Versions ==
The original domestic version is scored for the three voices (Box, tenor; Cox, baritone; and Bouncer, mostly baritone and partly counter-tenor) and piano. Sullivan wrote the role of Bouncer partly in the alto range for Foster, a counter-tenor (including the high line in the "Rataplan trio"), but subsequently the role was played by a bass-baritone. For the theatre, Sullivan rescored the piece for his usual small orchestra of about 30 players. He added a short overture and some additional music in the main piece, including the extended duet, "Stay, Bouncer, Stay!". This version plays for just under an hour. For the 1894 revival by the D'Oyly Carte Opera Company, Sullivan cut the "Sixes" duet (No. 9) in which Box and Cox each try to lose (the stake being the unwanted Penelope Ann). He also cut verses from numbers 2 (first verse); 3 (Cox's first verse, "That two are two" and a repeat of the "Rataplan" duet); 4 (second verse); 6 (a repeat of the "Rataplan" trio) and the vocal sections of 10 (finale). Dialogue cuts were also made.

In 1921 the D'Oyly Carte Opera Company prepared the "Savoy Edition", which they presented thereafter as a curtain raiser. It made further minor cuts throughout the score, but restored the finale (except for Bouncer's reprise). Box's verse in No.7, "The Buttercup", was also omitted, and further dialogue cuts were made. The keys of some of the numbers are lower in the Savoy Version, so that Bouncer is best sung by a bass-baritone. The key changes, however, may have been first made by Sullivan for the 1894 revival. The Savoy Edition runs about half an hour. The changes were made by D'Oyly Carte musical director Harry Norris. Additional orchestrations were added at various places by Geoffrey Toye, the conductor of the company's 1920–21 London season. According to the musicologist Roger Harris, "taken all together, the tamperings of the 1921 version amount to a considerable vandalization of Sullivan's original score, and it is a matter for regret that this version should have been presented to successive generations as the genuine article."

== Discography ==
The first commercial recording of Cox & Box was not made until 1961. Both D'Oyly Carte recordings use the heavily cut "Savoy Version" of the score that the company performed as a curtain raiser to other operas, whereas the more recent recordings use a less heavily pruned score. All the recordings listed below except the Chandos set include dialogue.

- 1961 D'Oyly Carte (with The Gondoliers) – New Symphony Orchestra of London, Conductor, Isidore Godfrey; Joseph Riordan (Box), Alan Styler (Cox) and Donald Adams (Bouncer).
- 1972 Gilbert and Sullivan for All (with Trial by Jury) – Piano accompaniment by John Burrows; Thomas Round (Box), Adams (Cox) and Thomas Lawlor (Bouncer).
- 1978 D'Oyly Carte (with The Zoo) – Conductor, Royston Nash; Geoffrey Shovelton (Box), Gareth Jones (Cox) and Michael Rayner (Bouncer).
- 1984 Sir Arthur Sullivan Society – Piano accompaniment by Kenneth Barclay; Ian Kennedy (Box), Leon Berger (Cox) and Donald Francke (Bouncer).
- 2004 BBC National Orchestra of Wales (with Trial by Jury) – Conductor, Richard Hickox; James Gilchrist (Box), Neal Davies (Cox) and Donald Maxwell (Bouncer); issued on the Chandos label. Dialogue is omitted and replaced by a narration written by Maxwell and delivered by him in the character of Bouncer.

For a nearly complete orchestral version with all the numbers that Sullivan composed, there is a video recording produced in 1982 as part of the Brent Walker series of Gilbert and Sullivan videos, together with Trial by Jury. Conductor, Alexander Faris; John Fryatt (Box), Russell Smythe (Cox) Thomas Lawlor (Bouncer). The Gilbert and Sullivan Discography considers this video to be the best of the series.

== Notes and references ==
Notes

== Sources ==
- Adams, William Davenport (1904). A Dictionary of the Drama. London: Chatto & Windus. p. 349. OCLC 1012840. "who was not then a professional actor blunt."
- Allen, Reginald (1975). Sir Arthur Sullivan: Composer and Personage. New York: Pierpont Morgan Library. ISBN 087598049X.
- Benford, Harry (1999). The Gilbert & Sullivan Lexicon, 3rd Revised Edition. Ann Arbor, Michigan: The Queensbury Press. ISBN 0-9667916-1-4.
- Eden, David, ed. (1994). The Chieftain: A Centenary Review of Sullivan's Partnership with F. C. Burnand. Coventry, UK: The Sir Arthur Sullivan Society. OCLC 634833866.
- Gielgud, John (1979). An Actor and His Time. London: Sidgwick and Jackson. ISBN 0283985739.
- Harris, Roger, ed. (1999). Cox and Box (full score and introduction). Chorleywood, Hertfordshire, UK: R. Clyde. OCLC 45237257.
- Jacobs, Arthur (1984). Arthur Sullivan: A Victorian Musician. Oxford: Oxford University Press. ISBN 0-931340-51-9.
- Lamont, L M (1912). Thomas Armstrong, A Memoir. 1832–1911. London: Martin Secker. OCLC 2378593.
- MacQueen-Pope, W J (1947). Carriages at Eleven. London: Robert Hale. OCLC 220770781.
- Rollins, Cyril; R John Witts (1962). The D'Oyly Carte Opera Company in Gilbert and Sullivan Operas: A Record of Productions, 1875–1961. London: Michael Joseph. OCLC 504581419.
- Yates, Edmund (1884). Edmund Yates – His Recollections and Experiences. London: R Bentley and Son. p. 44. OCLC 2468182. "Yates was the beginning of the Volunteer."
