= John Maddison Morton =

English playwright (1811–1891)

- Caricature of Morton, 1876
- Born: 3 January 1811
- Died: 19 December 1891 (aged 80)
- Occupations: Playwright, writer
- Father: Thomas Morton

John Maddison Morton (3 January 1811 – 19 December 1891) was an English playwright who specialised in one-act farces. His most famous farce was Box and Cox (1847). He also wrote comic dramas, pantomimes and other theatrical pieces.

== Biography ==
Morton was born in Pangbourne. His father, Thomas Morton, was also a well-known dramatist.

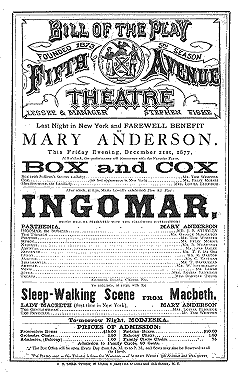
Morton's Box and Cox premiered in London in 1847.

Morton's first farce, My First Fit of the Gout, was produced in London in 1835. He was the author of several other one-act farces, including My Husband's Ghost (1836), Chaos Is Come Again (1838), A Thumping Legacy (1843), Lend Me Five Shillings (1846), The Irish Tiger (1846), Done on Both Sides (1847), Who's My Husband? (1847), Going to the Derby (1848), Slasher and Crasher! (1848), Your Life's in Danger (1848), Poor Pillicoddy (1848), Where There's a Will There's a Way (1849), A Most Unwarrantable Intrusion (1849) My Precious Betsy (1850), Sent to the Tower (1850), Grimshaw, Bagshaw, and Bradshaw (1851), The Woman I Adore! (1852), A Capital Match! (1852), Waiting for an Omnibus in the Lowther Arcade on a Rainy Day (1854), A Game of Romps (1855), How Stout You're Getting! (1855), The Rights and Wrongs of Women (1856), The Little Savage (1858), Wooing One's Wife (1861), Drawing Rooms, Second Floor, and Attics (1864), My Wife's Bonnet (1865) and A Day's Fishing (1869).

Morton lived in Chertsey for many years. It was there that he wrote Box and Cox (1847), adapting it from a French play. The New York Times in 1891 called it "the best farce of the nineteenth century". (Note: Box and Cox was in the tradition of E. F. Prieur and A. Letorzec's Une Chambre pour Deux (1839), and The Double-Bedded Room (1843), a skit about two men who occupy the same room without being aware of each other's existence, having been tricked by their landlady Mrs Bouncer. The latter play was returned to the French stage by Charles Varin and Charles Lefèvre as Une Chambre à Deux Lits (1846). How much Morton's play owed to its predecessors is not clear. Morton is not known to have pronounced on the matter, but F. C. Burnand, who later adapted Box and Cox as an operetta discounted the importance of La Chambre à Deux Lits. He wrote, "Whether La Chambre was 'taken from the Spanish', who, I dare say, have got on very well without it, or not, certainly it was not the original source of Box and Cox. This immortal English farce was adapted – a masterpiece of adaptation, be it said – from a comédie-vaudeville by Labiche and Lefranc entitled Frisette." Burnand added that the later sections of the plot of Box and Cox, namely the men's connubial entanglements, their efforts to evade them, and the discovery that they are brothers, were not derived from anyone, and were "thoroughly Mortonian".) Box and Cox was wildly successful, earning him about £7,000, and was translated into many European languages. A musical version, Cox and Box (1867), was created by F. C. Burnand and Arthur Sullivan, but Morton received no royalties from it. However, it brought him a measure of fame as it is often revived by Gilbert and Sullivan fans, helping to make it his best known work.

Morton wrote several comic dramas in two acts, including Old Honesty (1848), All That Glitters Is Not Gold (1851), From Village to Court (1854), The Muleteer of Toledo, or King, Queen and Knave (1855), Our Wife, or The Rose of Amiens (1856), A Husband to Order (1859), She Would and He Wouldn't (1862), Woodcock's Little Game (1864) and Little Mother (1870). Our Wife was made into an 1883 operetta by John Philip Sousa called Désirée.

Many of Morton's pieces enjoyed great success and contributed to building up the reputations of leading comic actors such as John Buckstone (who was Box in the first representation of Box and Cox and Mr. Pillicoddy in the original London cast of Poor Pillicoddy), Henry Compton and the Keeleys. In 1873 Marion Terry made her first West End appearances in his plays, A Game of Romps and All That Glitters Is Not Gold at the Olympic Theatre. Sullivan's later collaborator W. S. Gilbert made reference to the well-known Morton in his story "My First Brief".

In Morton's last decades, the popularity of Victorian burlesque greatly diminished the market for farces. He fell on hard times and in 1881 became a Charterhouse pensioner. His last new play to be produced in his lifetime, at Toole's Theatre in 1885, was a three-act farcical comedy called Going It, which kept the house in a continual roar of laughter. It was said of Morton that "The unlucky thing about him was that though he could write as well at 80 as at 30, he was left stranded high and dry by the receding wave of fashion." He died at the Charterhouse on 19 December 1891 and was buried on the 23rd at Kensal Green Cemetery.

== Modern revivals ==
Despite his prolific play writing career, Morton has not been performed regularly since his death, with the exception of Cox and Box. In 1967 Kenneth Tynan wrote that a "re-discovery is long overdue". In 1967 the National Theatre performed Morton's A Most Unwarrantable Intrusion as part of a triple bill including a play by John Lennon.

As a bicentenary celebration of Morton's birth, in June 2011 the Orange Tree Theatre presented a triple bill of three of Morton's one act farces, Slasher and Crasher!, A Most Unwarrantable Intrusion and Grimshaw, Bagshaw and Bradshaw, directed by Henry Bell. The Guardian's reviewer Michael Billington commented that the production "proves the prolific Morton is unjustly neglected", praising Bell's productions.

== Works ==
- Box and Cox: A Romance of Real Life in One Act. (1848)
- A Desperate Game: A Comic Drama in One Act (1853)
- Woodcock's Little Game: A Comedy Farce, In Two Acts (1864)
- Drawing Rooms, Second Floor, and Attics: A Farce, in One Act (1864)

== Notes and references ==
Notes

== Bibliography ==
- Tynan, Kenneth (1994). The Kenneth Tynan Letters. London: Minerva. ISBN 0-517-39926-1.
