= Thomas Lawlor (bass-baritone) =

Irish opera singer

Thomas Lawlor as Captain Corcoran in H.M.S. Pinafore

Thomas F. Lawlor (17 June 1938 – 9 October 2020) was an Irish opera singer. In the 1960s, he became known for his performances in mostly baritone roles of the Gilbert and Sullivan operas with the D'Oyly Carte Opera Company. In the 1970s and 1980s, he performed over 60 operatic roles, usually as a bass-baritone, with various British opera companies. He was also a director in the opera department of the Royal Academy of Music and at Trinity College of Music. In later years, he moved to the US, where he continued to perform, direct and teach.

== Early life and D'Oyly Carte ==
Lawlor was born and raised in Dublin, the son of Thomas Lawlor and his wife Elizabeth née Hendrick. His siblings were Marie Lee, Vera Gow, Patricia Stewart and Brendan Lawlor. He studied at University College Dublin, earning a B.A. in Philosophy and English. For a time he taught English, Geography and Gaelic. At the same time, he performed as an amateur in musicals and studied singing part-time at the Dublin College of Music where, in 1960, he won the Sam Heilbut Major Scholarship, which helped him to attend the Guildhall School of Music for three years. He began to perform professionally in musicals and concerts.

In 1963, Lawlor was engaged as a chorister by the D'Oyly Carte Opera Company, performing in the Gilbert and Sullivan operas. He soon was called upon to understudy and occasionally performed the small roles of Guron in Princess Ida and the Second Yeoman in The Yeomen of the Guard. During the company's tour of the US in 1964–65, Lawlor sang at the Carnegie Hall in New York, as a guest artist in a gala concert of Irish music. In 1965, he was given three principal parts of his own with D'Oyly Carte: the Counsel in Trial by Jury, Strephon in Iolanthe, and Pish-Tush in The Mikado. He also played the role of Second Yeoman in some seasons and, when Princess Ida was revived in 1967, added Guron. From 1966, he understudied the roles of Giuseppe in The Gondoliers (taking that role as his own the following season) and Captain Corcoran in H.M.S. Pinafore. He also played the Sergeant of Police in The Pirates of Penzance in some seasons. From 1968, he added three more principal roles on a regular basis (giving up his smaller roles): Captain Corcoran, Florian in Princess Ida, and the Lieutenant of the Tower in Yeomen. A new role in 1970 was Sergeant Bouncer in Cox and Box. Lawlor married D'Oyly Carte mezzo-soprano Pauline Wales in 1971, and the two had a daughter, Frances Galvan.

== Opera career and later years ==
Lawlor left D'Oyly Carte in 1971 to pursue a more varied career in opera, singing over 60 operatic roles. He immediately drew good notices: The Times reviewed his Don Alfonso in Così fan tutte in September of that year, commenting, "his eagle-eyed squire of an Alfonso, wise in the knowledge that he will be proved right in the end ... is an interpretation much preferable to the buffo clowning seen in this role at Glyndebourne." The next year, the same paper called his Osmin in Die Entführung aus dem Serail "imposing ... a figure of menace as well as of fun, with the voice to go with both sides of the character". In 1982 a review called his Baron Wepps in Der Vogelhändler "a model of style for the other singers to emulate. Impeccable timing allied to subtle underplaying made even the female impersonation of Wepps's first-act duet with his nephew Stanislaus amusing". Among his roles in the British Isles were:

- Glyndebourne Festival Opera (1971–1978): Lackey in Ariadne auf Naxos, Guard/Police Chief in Der Besuch der alten Dame, Antonio in The Marriage of Figaro, Major-Domo in Capriccio, Lawyer in Intermezzo, Harašta in The Cunning Little Vixen, Zaretsky in Eugene Onegin, Keeper of the Madhouse in The Rake's Progress and Benoît in La bohème.
- Glyndebourne Touring Opera (1971–1976): Zaretsky in Eugene Onegin, Don Alfonso in Così fan tutte, Schaunard in La bohème, Osmin in Die Entführung aus dem Serail, Bartolo in The Marriage of Figaro, the Hermit in Der Freischütz.
- Wexford Festival Opera (1971, 1989, 1990): Rambaldo in La rondine, Don Carlos in Betrothal in a Monastery, Noye in Noye's Fludde and Lynch in The Rising of the Moon.
- Phoenix Opera (UK) (1970s): Plunkett in Martha. The Times noted his "rich bass-baritone" in this role.
- Sadler's Wells Opera/English National Opera (1970s–1980s): roles in Patience, H.M.S. Pinafore, La traviata, The Marriage of Figaro, Julietta, Fidelio Rigoletto and Cinderella, in which The Times praised his musicianship and called his Don Magnifico "a well-judged impersonation". His Baron Zeta in The Merry Widow was judged amusing, "but with a lean, unfulsome joviality that gives fresh interest to the part".
- Kent Opera (1973 – 1983): Sir Joseph Porter in H.M.S Pinafore, Pasha Selim in Die Entführung aus dem Serail, Tempo (Time) in Il ritorno d'Ulisse in patria, Sparafucile in Rigoletto, Rocco in Fidelio, Leporello in Don Giovanni, Guglielmo in Così, Sir Despard in Ruddigore and the title character Telemann's The Patience of Socrates (British premiere). Concerning the last, Stanley Sadie, writing for The Times, commented: "Among the large cast there was some specially accomplished singing from Thomas Lawlor".
- Royal Opera (1974): Alcindoro in La bohème.
- Opera North (1979–1988): Jupiter in Orpheus in the Underworld, Baron Zeta in The Merry Widow, the Sacristan in Tosca, Tovey in The Mines of Sulphur, Marti in A Village Romeo and Juliet, Kuno in Der Freischütz, Kecal in The Bartered Bride, Geronte in Manon, the Magistrate in Werther, Somarone in Béatrice et Bénédict, Giles Lacy in Wilfred Josephs's Rebecca (world premiere), the Parson in The Cunning Little Vixen, the Artists' Manager in Jonny spielt auf (British premiere), the Grand Inquisitor in The Gondoliers, General Polkan in The Golden Cockerel, Pooh-Bah in The Mikado, and roles in Les mamelles de Tirésias and La Cenerentola.
- Dorset Opera (1982): Baron Wepps in Der Vogelhändler.
- New Sadler's Wells Opera (1980s): Pooh-Bah in The Mikado, Dick Deadeye in H.M.S. Pinafore and Sir Roderic Murgatroyd in Ruddigore.

He also sang with such companies as Dublin Grand Opera Society and Netherlands Opera, at the music festivals of Hintlesham, Camden, Singapore, Valencia (Spain), Colorado and Michigan, and in concerts and recitals in major concert halls, especially in Britain, Ireland and the US. Lawlor occasionally returned to Gilbert and Sullivan; he appeared as a guest artist with D'Oyly Carte in August 1971 and again in 1974–75 as Florian, as well as in the other Savoy opera roles noted above for ENO, Kent Opera and Opera North. In the early 1990s, he appeared with the London Savoyards in the roles of Dick Deadeye in Pinafore, the title role in Mikado, and the Pirate King in Pirates.

Lawlor was a director in the opera department of the Royal Academy of Music and at Trinity College of Music, both in London, and later for opera at the Bay View Music Festival in Michigan. He was a member of the music faculty of Brown University and Rhode Island College, where he taught voice and directed in the Opera Workshop. Lawlor and Wales's marriage ended in divorce, and he remarried and divorced again, later moving to the US and becoming a citizen. He then founded and served as artistic director for Beavertail Productions, a company that specialised in educational operatic programming for adults and children. For Beavertail, he created and directed an entertainment called Gilbert & Sullivan: A Life, which he presented in New England in the 1990s. In 1992, Lawlor married Jill née Rogers, a mezzo-soprano and co-founder of Beavertail.

He was an avid hiker and "a keen amateur geologist", recording BBC television programmes about his favorite walks, and the geology and history of West Yorkshire. He also enjoyed cooking, especially Indian cuisine, and was active in his church. Lawlor continued to perform, direct and teach until at least 2011. In later years, he and his wife lived in Rhode Island.

Lawlor died in 2020 at the age of 82 at his home in Rhode Island. He is buried at St. Ann's Cemetery, Cranston, Rhode Island.

== Recordings ==
Lawlor's roles recorded with D'Oyly Carte include Second Yeoman in The Yeomen of the Guard (1964) and Captain Corcoran in H.M.S. Pinafore (1971), as well as excerpts from the roles of Giuseppe and Strephon on a 1970 highlights LP entitled Songs and Snatches. He also was Pish-Tush in the 1966 film version of The Mikado. He recorded Bouncer with Gilbert and Sullivan for All (1972) and appeared in the same role in the 1982 Brent Walker video of Cox and Box. In 1987, he recorded the roles of Dick Deadeye in Pinafore and Roderic in Ruddigore with the New Sadler's Wells Opera. His other recordings include parts in The Rake's Progress by Stravinskly, Marie-Magdeleine by Massenet, La riconoscenza by Rossini, Cendrillon by Pauline Viardot and Le Carrosse du Saint-Sacrement, a comic opera by Lord Berners. He also appeared in television movies of The Marriage of Figaro as Antonio (1973), an abridged version of Rigoletto (1974) in English, and The Rake's Progress as The Keeper of the Madhouse (1975).
