= How He Lied to Her Husband =

1904 play by George Bernard Shaw

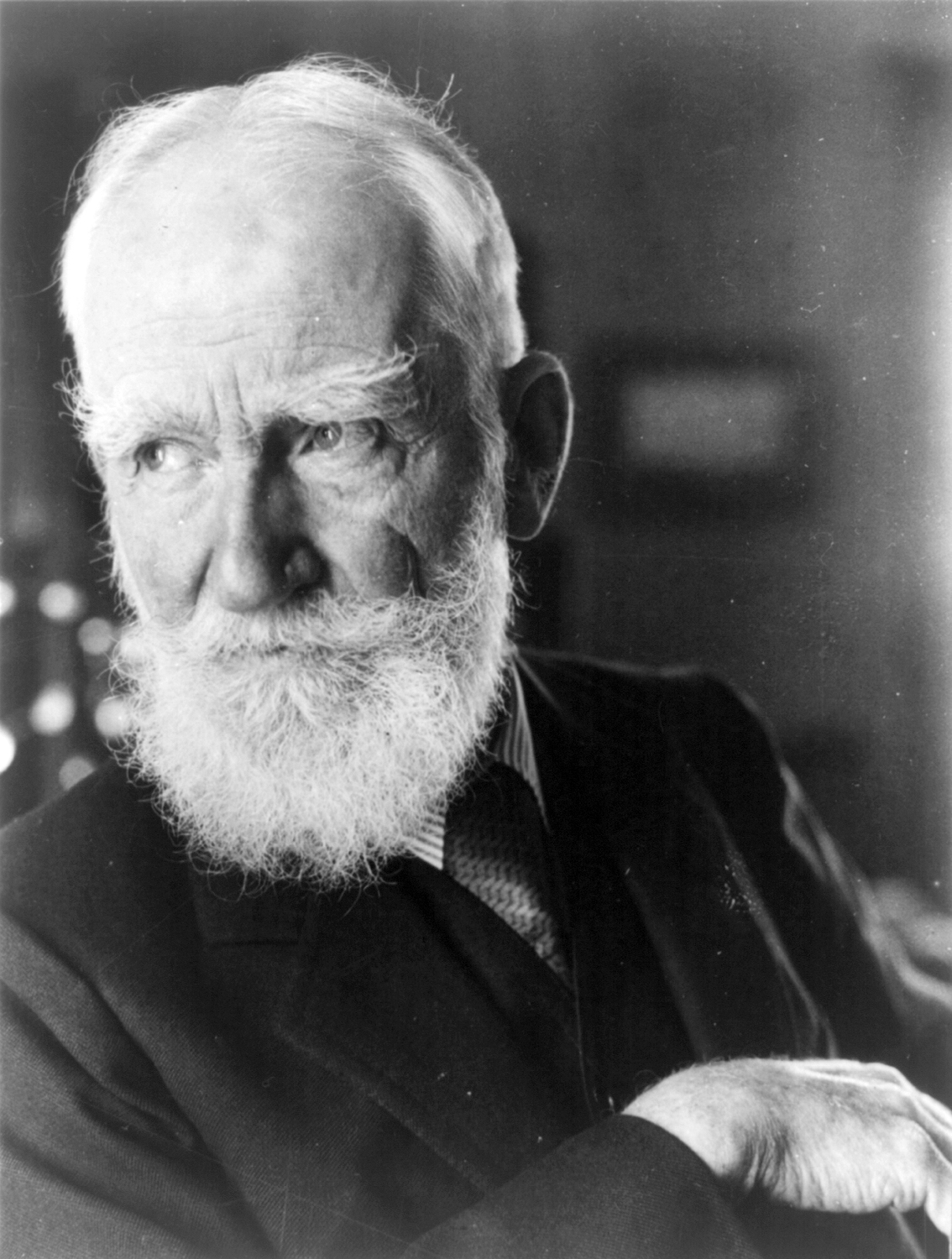
- Written by: George Bernard Shaw
- Original language: English
- Subject: A poet falls in love with a married woman
- Genre: comedy of manners
- Setting: A flat in Cromwell Road, London

Premiere
- Date premiered: 26 September 1904
- Place premiered: New York, Berkeley Lyceum

How He Lied to Her Husband is a one-act comedy play by George Bernard Shaw, who wrote it, at the request of actor Arnold Daly, over a period of four days while he was vacationing in Scotland in 1904. In its preface he described it as "a sample of what can be done with even the most hackneyed stage framework by filling it in with an observed touch of actual humanity instead of with doctrinaire romanticism." The play has often been interpreted as a kind of satirical commentary on Shaw's own highly successful earlier play Candida (which one of the characters gets tickets to see).

It was first performed by Daly in New York as a curtain raiser for The Man of Destiny. The original 1905 London cast were Harley Granville-Barker as Henry Apjohn, A. G. Poulton as Teddy Bompas, and Gertrude Kingston as Aurora Bompas.

== Characters ==
- Her Lover (Henry Apjohn)
- Her Husband (Teddy Bompas)
- Herself (Aurora Bompas)

== Plot ==
The three-character play is set in the drawing room of a flat located on Cromwell Road in London. Shaw describes Henry Apjohn as "a very beautiful youth, moving as in a dream, walking as on air," while Aurora Bompas has "an air of being a young and beautiful woman but as a matter of hard fact, she is, dress and pretensions apart, a very ordinary South Kensington female of about 37, hopelessly inferior in physical and spiritual distinction to the beautiful youth." The third character is Aurora's husband Teddy, "a robust, thicknecked, well groomed city man, with a strong chin but a blithering eye and credulous mouth."

Aurora is distressed because she has misplaced some poems, in which she is identified by name, written for her with declarations of love by the impetuous Henry. She suspects her sister-in-law Georgina stole them from her workbox and is concerned she will read them to Aurora's husband Teddy.

Henry suggests they confront Teddy with the truth, "quietly, hand in hand" and depart – "without concealment and subterfuge, freely and honestly, in full honor and self-respect" – for their planned evening at the theatre. (Henry has purchased tickets for Candida – the popular Shaw comedy which Henry and Aurora's situation closely resembles – because Lohengrin was sold out.) The two engage in a discussion about the merits of revealing their affair until Teddy arrives and confronts Henry with his poetry.

The young man tries to convince him they were inspired by Aurora, the goddess of dawn, rather than his wife, and assures him he has no interest in the woman Teddy married . . . which the cuckolded man finds so insulting he demands Henry admit how desirable Aurora is. Henry finally confesses his love for Aurora, which pleases Teddy so much he proposes he have the poems published on "the finest paper, sumptuous binding, everything first class" as a tribute to his wife. "What shall we call the volume?," Teddy asks. "To Aurora, or something like that, eh?," to which Henry replies, "I should call it How He Lied to Her Husband."

== Preface ==
Shaw stated that, "Nothing in the theatre is staler than the situation of husband, wife and lover, or the fun of knockabout farce. I have taken both, and got an original play out of them, as anybody else can if only he will look about him for his material instead of plagiarizing Othello and the thousand plays that have proceeded on Othello's romantic assumptions and false point of honour."

== Relation to Candida ==
The play followed the huge success of Candida, which came to be labelled "Candidamania". Shaw wrote it as a response to the "New York Hausfrau's conception of his 'Candida'". According to Archibald Henderson "It gave rise to the usual misunderstandings incident to the production of a new Shaw play, many of the critics fatuously imagining that Shaw was only making fun of his own Candida!"" Henderson adds that the play is intended to be "after the Ibsen model" and to present "the obverse of Candida—in farce, not in tragicomedy. This little topsy-turvy knockabout farce is the reductio ad absurdum of the Candidamaniacs. The persistent misinterpretation of the meaning and purpose of this little farce finally compelled Shaw to cable: "Need I say that anyone who imagines that How He Lied to Her Husband retracts Candida, or satirises it, or travesties it, or belittles it in any way, understands neither the one nor the other?"

== Adaptations ==
Frank Launder and Cecil Lewis adapted Shaw's play for a 1931 British short film directed by Lewis and starring Edmund Gwenn as Teddy, Vera Lennox as Aurora, and Robert Harris as Henry.

A July 1937 BBC broadcast starred Greer Garson, D.A. Clarke-Smith, and Derek Williams.

In 1956, Walt Witcover staged an off-Broadway production of How He Lied to Her Husband with Jerry Stiller as Teddy, Charles Nelson Reilly as Henry and Anne Meara as Aurora, as part of an evening of three one-act plays. Witcover re-staged the play in 1999 with Nick Psaltos as Teddy, Michael Stebbins as Henry and Victoria Thompson as Aurora.
