= Gertrude Kingston =

British actress (1862–1937)

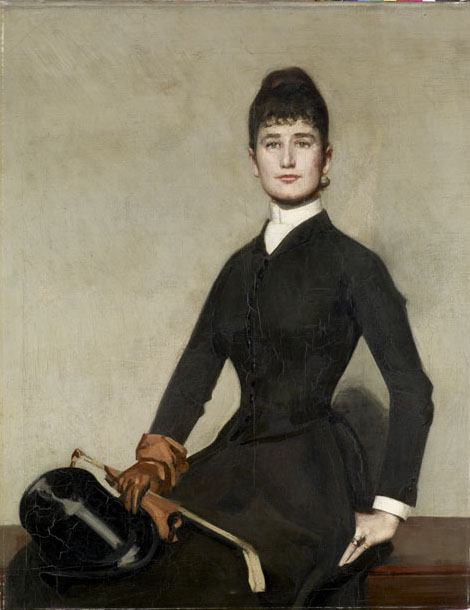
Gertrude Kingston by Sidney Starr (1888)

Gertrude Kingston (born Gertrude Angela Kohnstamm; 24 September 1862 – 7 November 1937) was an actress, an English actor-manager and artist.

== Early life ==
Kingston was born in Islington in London, the daughter of merchant Heiman Kohnstamm and his wife, Teresina (née Friedmann), who were Jewish. She was the sister of legal author and county court judge Edwin Max Konstam (1870–1956), born as Edwin Max Kohnstamm. Kingston was privately educated and travelled extensively with her mother and governess. She studied painting in Berlin and Paris and later published three illustrated books.

Her first theatrical experience was as a child, performing amateur impersonations of famous actors of the day such as Henry Irving and Sarah Bernhardt. Aged fifteen W. S. Gilbert selected her to play the lead in an amateur production of Broken Hearts. On her marriage in 1889 to Captain George Silver (1858/9–1899) of the East Surrey Regiment, Kingston decided to become a professional actress to support herself and her husband financially. Ellen Terry suggested that Kingston should enrol in the School of Acting run by actor-manager Sarah Thorne in Margate, and for whom she played Ophelia in Hamlet and Emilia in Othello. At this time she also played Penelope in the English-language versions of The Tale of Troy and Clytemnestra in Aeschylus' Agamemnon.

== Theatrical career ==
Gertrude Kingston in the title role in Lysistrata (1910)

In 1894 she appeared in The Charlatan at the Haymarket Theatre for Robert Buchanan. Joining the company of Herbert Beerbohm Tree she played Mrs Harkaway in Partners, following which she became in great demand on the London stage, going on to appear as Clara Dexter in The Woodbarrow, which she also produced, and Mrs Graves in A Matchmaker, which she wrote with Clotilde Graves. The latter play gained a certain notoriety when it was criticised for comparing marriage to prostitution.

On the death of her husband in 1899, just before the start of the Boer War, Kingston raised subscriptions to open a nursing hut for British troops in South Africa; some accounts of her life claim that she went to South Africa herself and worked in her hospital as a nurse, a claim not substantiated in her autobiography, in which she wrote that she was persuaded not to go. She remained active in the theatre over the next decade; in 1905 at the Royal Court Theatre she played Helen in the tragedy The Trojan Women by Euripides, and Aurora Bompas in Bernard Shaw's How He Lied to Her Husband opposite Harley Granville-Barker. Also in 1905 her portrait in charcoal was executed by John Singer Sargent.

In 1910 she became the lessee and actor-manager of the Little Theatre in the Adelphi in London. Her opening season was inspired by the Royal Court Theatre's introduction of serious and classical drama to a commercial audience, and therefore she opened with Aristophanes' Lysistrata, in a version adapted and modernised by Lawrence Housman, in which she played the title role. In 1911 Lillah McCarthy took over the lease of the Little Theatre, and Kingston returned to that theatre under McCarthy's management to play Madame Arcadina in The Seagull. Also in 1912 Kingston played Lady Cecily Waynflete in Captain Brassbound's Conversion. Then in 1913 George Bernard Shaw wrote the title role in his play Great Catherine for her.

== Later years ==
Kingston was in the United States for much of World War I where she gave talks about the war effort in Britain. In Boston she appeared in three plays by Shaw, including Great Catherine. In 1916 she appeared with her own theatrical company in The Queen's Enemies, and in four plays by Shaw: The Inca of Perusalem, Great Catherine, Overruled and How He Lied to Her Husband, and played Ermyntrude in Shaw's The Inca of Perusalem with the Pioneer Players, the Women's suffrage theatre company; for some years she had been a speaker on behalf of the suffrage movement in Britain. She organised a war charities' revue in London in 1916 in aid of the Star and Garter Home.

After World War I Kingston returned to Britain where she resumed her acting career, also becoming a regular speaker for the Conservative Party. In 1924 she considered standing for Parliament. She taught public speaking and became a journalist, writing on a variety of subjects. In 1927 an exhibition of her Lacquer work was held in New York City, her technique becoming known as 'Kingston lacquer'. Also in 1927 Kingston produced and appeared in Nevertheless in London. Her final performance was as Queen Elizabeth I in When Essex Died in 1932. In 1937 her autobiography Curtsey While You're Thinking was published.

Gertrude Kingston died at the Empire Nursing Home in Westminster in London in 1937 aged 75.

== See also ==
- Ada Ferrar
- Oskar Kohnstamm
