= Henry Compton (actor) =

English actor (1805–1877)

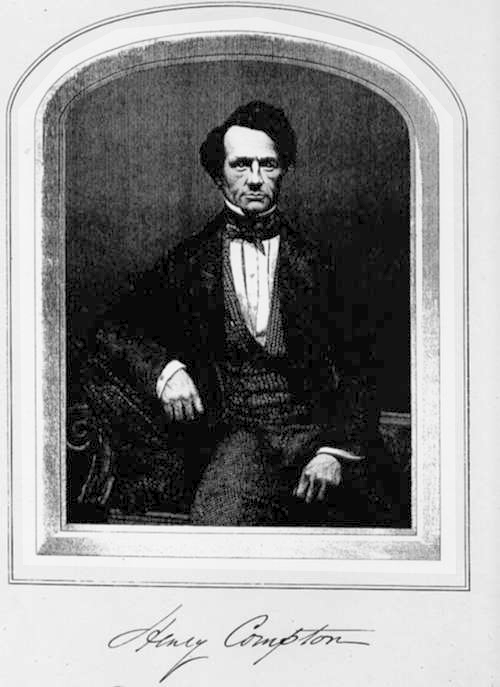
Henry Compton

Henry Compton (born Charles Mackenzie; 22 March 1805 – 15 September 1877) was an English actor best known for his Shakespearean comic roles.

Compton began his career in Shakespeare plays in the British provinces. He then began to specialize in low comedy roles in touring companies, where he played for over a decade. He first appeared in London in 1837 and joined the company at the Theatre Royal, Drury Lane later that year, again playing in Shakespeare. Other notable roles that followed included Tony Lumpkin in She Stoops to Conquer, Gnatbrain in Black-Eyed Susan, Sir Peter Teazle in The School for Scandal and Foresight in Love for Love. By the early 1840s, Compton had earned the reputation of being the best Shakespearian clown of his age both in London and in the provinces. He performed for three years at the Princess's Theatre, London, famously playing Touchstone in As You Like It in 1844. He also played at the Olympic Theatre for three years, then the Royal Strand Theatre. In 1853 he joined the company at the Haymarket Theatre, where he originated roles in important new plays. He also won praise as Mr. Cox in revivals of Box and Cox.

In the 1870s, he played frequently at the old Globe Theatre. One of his most famous roles was the Gravedigger in Hamlet, which he played often, including at the Lyceum Theatre with Henry Irving in 1875. Compton's last role was in 1877 in Liverpool as Pangloss in The Heir at Law. After he became ill, his friends organised two star-studded benefit performances for him in March 1877.

== Biography ==
Compton was born in Huntingdonshire the son of a minister of the Congregational church, St Neots. His parents were John Mackenzie and his wife, formerly Mrs Elizabeth Symonds, and he was the sixth of eleven children. Through both parents, Compton was related to members of the medical profession. After being educated at Huntingdon and at a boarding school at Little Baddow in Essex, Compton was apprenticed to his mother's brother, who was a cloth merchant in Aldermanbury, near London. Compton was unhappy with a life in trade and, desiring instead a life on the stage, ran away twice but was returned to his family each time. However, after running away for a third time in 1826, his family finally accepted his wish to become an actor. He took his grandmother's maiden name, Compton, as his stage name.

=== Early career ===
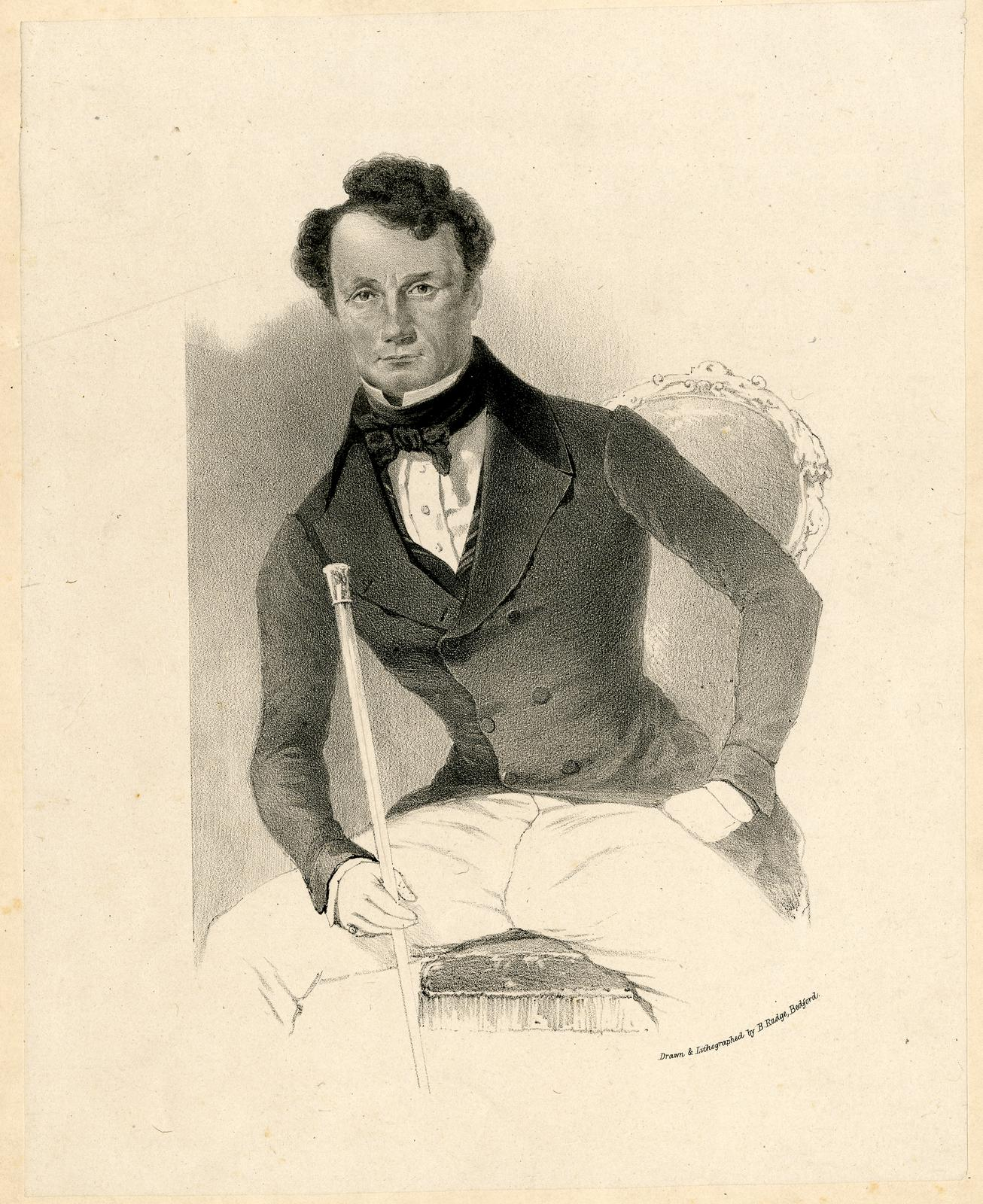
Drawing of Compton c. 1850

Compton's first professional appearances were in Shakespeare plays in the provinces. He then began to specialize in low comedy roles in touring companies, where he played for over a decade. He moved from Jackman's Bedford company to Fanny Robertson's Lincoln company in 1832 before moving to York in 1835.

He first appeared in London at the Theatre Royal Lyceum and English Opera House on 20 July 1837 as Tommy Tadpole in The Haunted Inn, followed, on 24 July 1837, as Robin in the musical farce The Waterman and as Paul Shack in Master's Rival. On the 27 July he was Frolick in The Mountain Sylph and as Simon in The Rendezvous. A Quarter to Nine by Peake was written to introduce Compton (Frolick) as an imitator or personator, and performed on 5 August. On 17 August he played Jean Jachere in Blanche of Jersey. On 24 August, he was Tranquille in The Little Laundress and Alessio in La Sonnambula! He added Sampson in Guy Mannering on 27 September.

After several further roles there, he joined the company at the Theatre Royal, Drury Lane in October 1837. His first appearance was as Master Slender in The Merry Wives of Windsor on 7 October. In December he was Tom in Peeping Tom of Coventry Other roles included those of Tony Lumpkin in She Stoops to Conquer, Gnatbrain in Black-Eyed Susan, Silky in The Road to Ruin, Bailie Nicol Jarvie, Mawworm in Isaac Bickerstaff's The Hypocrite, Marrall in Philip Massinger's A New Way to Pay Old Debts, and Dr Ollapod in George Colman's The Poor Gentleman. In 1839 he returned to Robertson's company and performed at the Georgian theatre in Wisbech, and other theatres in Robertson's Lincoln Circuit in the role of Touchstone in As you like it and Paul Shack in Master's Rival and again as Mawworm.

In August 1840 he distinguished himself as Lublin Log jnr in the new piece Like Father Like Son at the English Opera House. By the early 1840s, Compton had earned the reputation of being the best Shakespearian clown of his age. He continued in seasons at Dublin, Ireland, at Drury Lane (playing Polonius, Sir Peter Teazle in The School for Scandal, Launcelot Gobbo in The Merchant of Venice, and Foresight in William Congreve's Love for Love), at Manchester and elsewhere. At the Princess's Theatre, London, where he performed for three years, he famously played Touchstone in Shakespeare's As You Like It in 1844. He was then at the Olympic Theatre, where he also remained three years. After the Olympic burned down, he moved to the Royal Strand Theatre. In 1853 he joined the company of John Baldwin Buckstone at the Haymarket Theatre, where he originated the role of Blenkinsop in An Unequal Match by Tom Taylor, Sir Solomon Frazer in Taylor's The Overland Route, De Vaudray in A Hero of Romance by Westland Marston, and Captain Mountraffe in Home by T. W. Robertson. He also played Mr. Cox in revivals of Box and Cox by John Maddison Morton with such success that W. S. Gilbert later wrote, "Mr. Morton's dialogue can only be properly given by Messrs. Buckstone and Compton, and in the mouths of any other actors it is, to those who have seen Messrs. Buckstone and Compton in the parts (and who has not?) a bore."

In 1848 Compton married the actress Emmeline Catherine Montague (1823–1911). They had seven children, all of whom had stage careers, including Charles Compton, Henry Compton and Katherine Compton. He was the grandfather of the actress Fay Compton. and the novelist Compton Mackenzie.

=== Later years ===
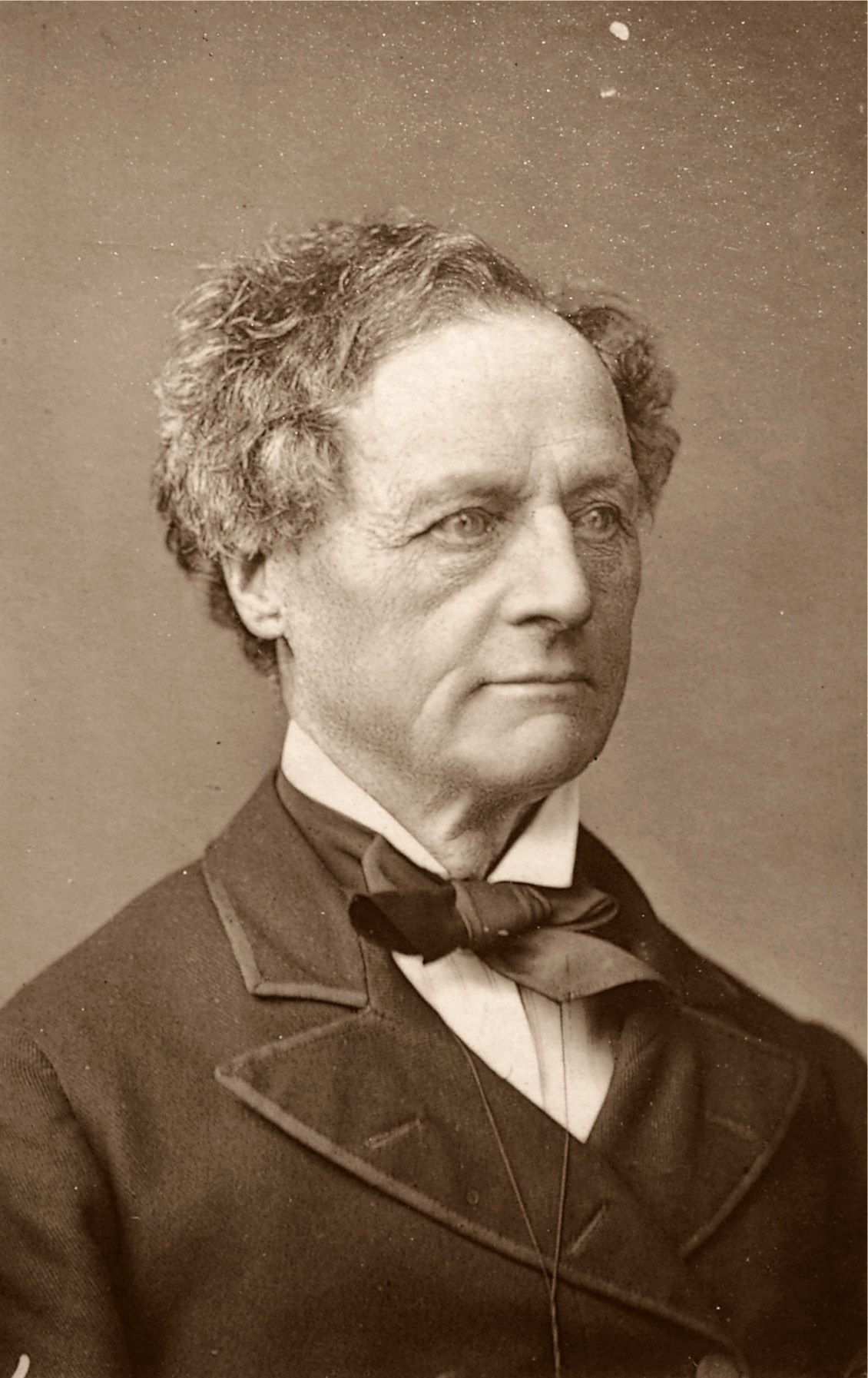
Compton in later years

In 1870, he was back at the Olympic in Taylor's Handsome is that Handsome Does, and in 1871 was in Partners for Life by H. J. Byron at the old Globe Theatre, where he performed in many plays thereafter. Compton's last role was in 1877 at the Prince of Wales's Theatre in Liverpool as Mawworm in The Hypocrite and Pangloss in George Colman's The Heir at Law. One of his most famous roles was as the Gravedigger in Hamlet, which he played often in his career, including at the Lyceum Theatre with Henry Irving in June 1875. Compton was described as "an actor perfectly original in his style, and possessing a fund of dry, quiet humour that never failed to minister to the amusement of the playing public." He then joined the Vezin-Chippendale tour. He appeared at the Haymarket as Tony Lumpkin in the Alehouse scene for Edgar Bruce's benefit on 9 August.

When Compton became ill with cancer and was unable to work to support his family, his friends organised two benefit performances for him. The first was held at Drury Lane on 1 March 1877. This performance included scenes from Othello; Bulwer Lytton's comedy Money, featuring Compton's son, Edward Compton; Sheridan's The Critic with Charles Mathews as Mr. Puff; Morton's Lend me Five Shillings; Macklin's Man of World; and Trial by Jury. Henry Irving, Joseph Jefferson, Squire Bancroft, Ellen Terry, J. L. Toole, Nellie Farren and many other leading stars took part. In Trial by Jury, conducted by Arthur Sullivan, W. S. Gilbert appeared as the Associate, Pauline Rita was the Plaintiff, W. H. Cummings was the Defendant and Arthur Cecil was the Usher. The chorus comprised leading stars such as W. S. Penley, George Grossmith, Kate Bishop and Marion Terry. The benefit realised over £3250, a large sum by the standards of the day. The second benefit, which was held at Manchester on 27 March 1877, was nearly as successful.

Compton died in 1877 after a long struggle with cancer at the age of 72 at his home, Seaforth House, Stanford Road, St. Mary Abbotts in Kensington, London. His will was proved at the Principal Registry on 17 October by his widow.

== Sources ==
- Neil R Wright (2016). Treading the Boards: Actors and Theatres in Georgian Lincolnshire. Society for Lincolnshire History & Archaeology.
