= Box and Cox (farce) =

One act farce by John Maddison Morton

The author, John Maddison Morton, caricatured in 1876

Box and Cox is a one act farce by John Maddison Morton. It is based on a French one-act vaudeville, Frisette, which had been produced in Paris in 1846.

Box and Cox was first produced at the Lyceum Theatre, London, on 1 November 1847, billed as a "romance of real life." The play became popular and was revived frequently through the end of the nineteenth century, with occasional productions in the twentieth century. It spawned two sequels by other authors, and was adapted as a one-act comic opera in 1866 by the dramatist F. C. Burnand and the composer Arthur Sullivan, Cox and Box, which also became popular and continues to be performed regularly. Other musical adaptations were made, but have not remained in the repertory.

The phrase "Box and Cox" has entered the English language: the Oxford English Dictionary defines it as "applied allusively to an arrangement in which two persons take turns in sustaining a part, occupying a position, or the like."

== Background ==
In the nineteenth century, it was common practice for plays to be adapted from French originals for the London stage, with changes often made to conform to Victorian playgoers' expectations. The main source of Morton's play was a French one-act vaudeville, Frisette, by Eugène Marin Labiche and Auguste Lefranc, which had been produced at the Théâtre du Palais-Royal, Paris in 1846. Some commentators have stated that Morton also drew on another vaudeville, La Chambre à Deux Lits (The Double Room), which itself reputedly derived from earlier French, English and Spanish comedies. (Note: Some sources name the play as Une Chambre à Deux Lits.) Morton is not known to have pronounced on the matter, but F. C. Burnand, who later adapted Box and Cox as an operetta, discounted the importance of La Chambre à Deux Lits. He wrote, "Whether La Chambre was 'taken from the Spanish', who, I dare say, have got on very well without it, or not, certainly it was not the original source of Box and Cox. This immortal English farce was adapted – a masterpiece of adaptation, be it said – from a comédie-vaudeville by Labiche and Lefranc entitled Frisette." Burnand added that the later sections of the plot of Box and Cox, namely the men's connubial entanglements, their efforts to evade them, and the discovery that they are brothers, were not derived from anyone, and were "thoroughly Mortonian".

In Frisette, an unscrupulous landlady rents the same room to a young woman (Frisette, a lace-maker) by night, and to a young man (Gaudrion, a baker) by day. In Box and Cox, both the lodgers are male.

== Original production ==
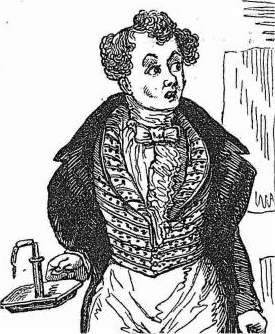
J. B. Buckstone, the first Box

Box and Cox was first performed at the Lyceum Theatre, London, on 1 November 1847. The cast was:

- James Cox – John Pritt Harley
- John Box – John Baldwin Buckstone
- Mrs Bouncer – Mrs (Frances) Macnamara.

Reviewing the first performance, The Standard said, "The piece is neatly and smartly written, but it is not difficult to guess that it owes its salvation solely to the felicitous whimsicalities of the two actors upon whom it chiefly devolves. The grotesque gentility of Harley, the hatter, is drolly matched by the cockney vulgarity of Buckstone, the printer, and both have ample room for the exhibition of their own peculiar conceits of method – those never-failing helps to mirth. Box and Cox, in short, are a pair of pleasant varlets, and promise to be long in the good graces of the public." The theatrical newspaper The Era said, "A more 'laughable farce' has not been produced for many a day."

The audience was enthusiastic, and Box and Cox became the first success of the Lyceum under the new management of Lucia Elizabeth Vestris and Charles Matthews. Matthews assumed the role of Cox later in the run.

== Plot ==
Mrs Bouncer, a London lodging-house keeper, is letting an apartment to a double tenantry – to Box, a printer on a daily newspaper, and to Cox, a journeyman hatter, the former occupying the room during the day, the latter during the night. They invariably meet on the stairs of the lodging-house when one comes in from work as the other is going out, but neither has any idea that Mrs Bouncer is letting his room to the other. Cox, suspicious that Mrs Bouncer has been using his flat during the day, complains to her that his coal keeps disappearing and there is "a steady increase of evaporation among my candles, wood, sugar and lucifer matches." He also complains that his room is continually full of tobacco smoke. Mrs Bouncer gives various excuses – among others, that Box, who, she says, occupies the attic, is a persistent smoker, and that his smoke must come down the chimney. Cox departs for his work at the hat shop, and on the stairs passes Box who is returning from the night shift at the newspaper.

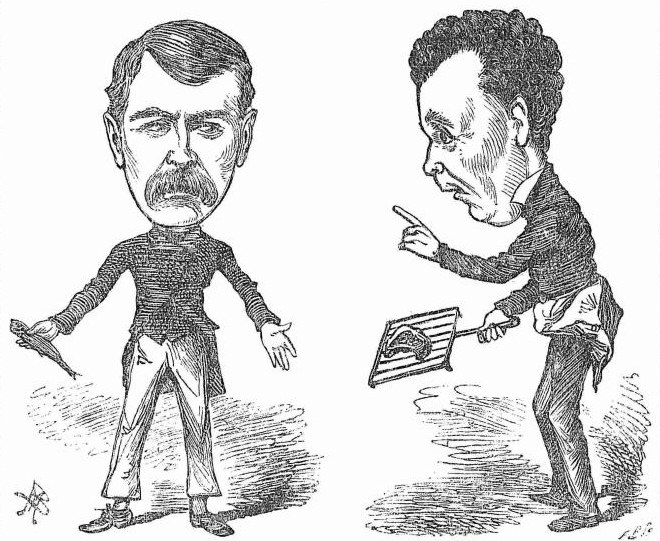
Edward Saker and Lionel Brough as Box and Cox, caricatured in 1883

Box has brought home with him a rasher of bacon, which he at once prepares to cook. He lights the fire, is indignant that his matches have been used and his candles burnt low; for, being at home only during the day, he suspects Mrs Bouncer of these depredations. Leaving his bacon to cook, he retires to bed for a short nap. Cox then returns, having been given the day off by his employer. He has bought a mutton chop and, going to cook it on the gridiron, finds the fire already lit and the rasher of bacon on the gridiron. He removes it, puts his chop in its stead, and hurries into an adjoining room for a plate. The slamming of the door awakens Box, who, recollecting his bacon, leaps from the bed, and finds the chop where he had left the rasher. He angrily seizes the chop, flings it from the window, and leaves the room to fetch a plate. Cox re-enters, and, in lieu of his chop, discovers the rasher, which follows the chop out of the window. Box and Cox meet, each imagining the other to be an intruder, each pulling from his pocket the last week's receipt for rent, and each clamouring loudly for redress from the landlady. Mrs Bouncer is forced to explain the mystery, and she throws herself on the kindness of Box and Cox by promising either of them a handsome second floor back room, which she hurries off to prepare.

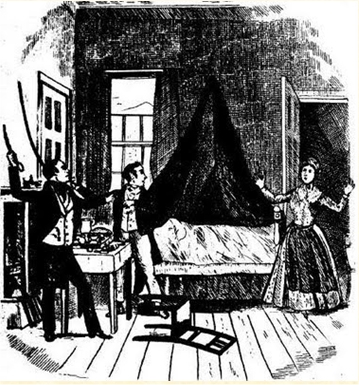
Box and Cox confront Mrs Bouncer; drawing circa 1850.

Frustrated, Box asks, "Hark ye, sir – can you fight?" Cox answers, "No, sir." Box: "No? Then come on!" Agreeing, however, that they have no quarrel with each other, and that the whole mess is Mrs Bouncer's fault, Box and Cox converse civilly. It emerges that Cox is about to be married to a widow, Penelope Anne Wiggins, a prosperous proprietress of bathing machines at Margate and Ramsgate. Box is astonished, as he too had once been engaged to Mrs Wiggins, but, he reveals, he had struck on an ingenious plan to escape her clutches: he had pretended to commit suicide by drowning. Cox is equally reluctant to marry her. The two argue about which of them is obliged to do so, and eventually they call for pistols. When Mrs Bouncer goes to bring them, Cox cries, "Stop! You don't mean to say ... that you keep loaded fire-arms in the house?" "Oh, no", says Mrs Bouncer, "they're not loaded". Cox: "Then produce the murderous weapons instantly!" Meanwhile, the two agree to cast dice; the loser must marry Penelope Anne. Both have loaded dice, and at each successive throw they continue to throw sixes. The dice are then changed for shillings. At every toss each man's coin lands on heads, as both contestants are using double-headed coins.

The impasse is broken when a letter arrives from Margate stating that Penelope Anne has drowned in a boating accident, and has left her property to her intended husband. Box and Cox now argue their claims to the bathing machines, but finally they agree to split the fortune. Now a second letter arrives, which states that Penelope Anne is quite safe and is on the road to London to claim her lover. Escape is now hopeless, and Box and Cox are in despair. A vehicle arrives, a knock resounds at the door, and Box and Cox place their backs to the door. Penelope Anne goes away again, leaving another letter revealing that she has decided to marry Mr Knox, an admirer nearer her own age. Box and Cox are delighted, and their happiness is completed by the realisation that they are brothers, who have been long separated (Box: "Have you such a thing as a strawberry mark on your left arm?" Cox: "No!" Box: "Then it is he!"). They reject the second-floor back room and determine to reside permanently in the same room, and under the tenancy of the same landlady.

== Later productions ==
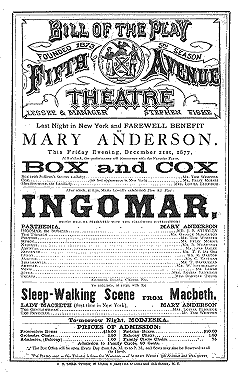
Poster for 1877 American production

The piece became a popular favourite; from late 1847 it was widely staged throughout the United Kingdom, and it was frequently performed to raise funds for causes including a new drama college and the proposed Shakespeare Memorial Theatre. In January 1849, a command performance of Box and Cox was given at Windsor Castle to Queen Victoria and her family and court. Harley and Buckstone repeated their original roles, and "the Royal party laughed heartily". The Queen and Prince Albert saw the play again in 1850, at a revival at the Haymarket Theatre, starring Buckstone, together with Hamlet and Buckstone's The Rough Diamond. Buckstone's revivals, co-starring Henry Compton as Cox, were so popular that W. S. Gilbert later wrote, "Mr Morton's dialogue can only be properly given by Messrs. Buckstone and Compton, and in the mouths of any other actors it is, to those who have seen Messrs. Buckstone and Compton in the parts (and who has not?) a bore." In 1856 a performance was given by army personnel in the Crimea, with an officer of the Royal Welsh Fusiliers playing Mrs Bouncer en travesti. The New York Times called the play "the best farce of the nineteenth century".

Box and Cox was revived at the Prince of Wales's Theatre, London, in 1867 with G. Honey as Box, John Hare as Cox, and Mrs Leigh Murray as Mrs Bouncer; (Note: Murray's wife performed as Mrs Elizabeth Leigh Murray.) and again at the Haymarket Theatre in 1889, with H. Nicholls as Cox, E. M. Robson as Box, and Mrs E. Phelps as Mrs Bouncer. It was first performed in America at the Arch Street Theatre, Philadelphia, with W. E. Burton and Joseph Jefferson in the title roles. In the twentieth century, it was successfully revived at the London Coliseum in 1924, the cast comprising Donald Calthrop, Hubert Harben and Dora Gregory, and in 1961 Lindsay Anderson directed the work at the Royal Court Theatre. In 1956, Walt Witcover staged an off-Broadway production of Box and Cox with Jerry Stiller as Box, Charles Nelson Reilly as Cox and Anne Meara as Mrs. Bouncer, as part of an evening of 3 one-act plays.

== Adaptations ==
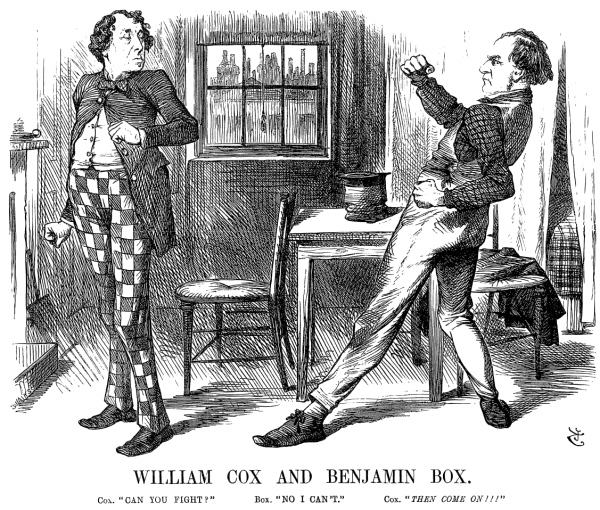
Disraeli (left) and Gladstone depicted as Box and Cox, Punch, 1870

The play became so well known that the humorous magazine Punch printed a mock examination paper on it for use in drama schools, with such questions as "What was Mrs Bouncer's ostensible employment? Would Mrs Siddons, at any time in her career, have been justified in refusing this part? If so, state when, and give your reasons." Punch (and others) also used the characters of Box and Cox to represent the two opposing British party leaders, Benjamin Disraeli and W. E. Gladstone.

The popularity of Box and Cox led to the production of a sequel, Box and Cox Married and Settled, a farce in one act, by Joseph Stirling Coyne, first performed at the Haymarket Theatre on 15 October 1852, with Buckstone as Box, Robert Keeley as Cox, Mr Coe as "an anonymous gent," Mrs Caulfield as Mrs Box, Mrs L. S. Buckingham as Mrs Cox, and Mrs Selby as Mrs Bouncer. The Morning Post gave this plot summary: "Box and Cox have both retired from business, both having been left enough money to live on, and they have a wife and baby apiece. Cox's better half turns out to be the former sweetheart of Box, who, in imprudently making himself known to her, is discovered by the lady's husband. There is, of course, immense indignation from Mr Cox and Mrs Box, and great fun arises out of the various demonstrations of these injured individuals. Everything, however, is arranged to the satisfaction of all parties."

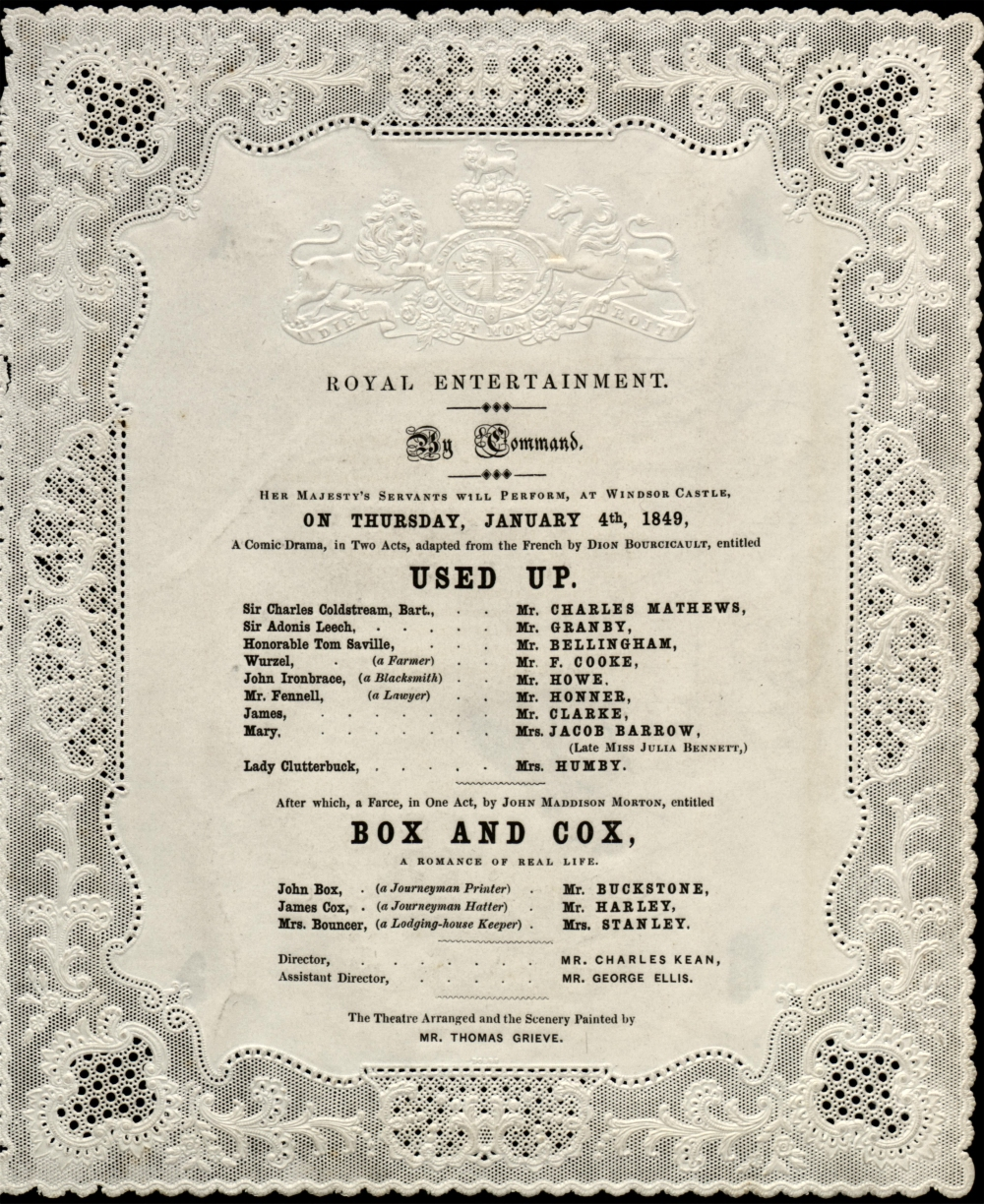
Programme for 1849 Royal Command performance at Windsor

F. C. Burnand wrote another short sequel, Penelope Anne, published in 1872. The main characters are Don José John Boxos de Caballeros y Carvalhos y Regalias, of Salamanca, generally known as "John Box"; Count Cornelius de Coxo, Land Margrave of Somewhere, with a palazzo in Venice, commonly known as "James Cox"; Mrs Penelope Anne Knox; and Major General Bouncer. Box and Cox have inherited titles from a Spanish and a Venetian relative respectively, and both now seek to marry the widowed and immensely rich Penelope Anne. Their quarrel is abruptly stopped when Penelope Anne introduces her new husband, General Bouncer (who is no relation to their former landlady). Burnand incorporated three musical numbers, writing new words to existing tunes by Bellini, Offenbach and the unknown composer of "Les Pompiers de Nanterre".

Box and Cox achieved further notice when Burnand adapted it as a comic opera libretto under the title of Cox and Box, set to music by Arthur Sullivan in 1866. The piece was Sullivan's first produced comic opera. It was played privately, then given a successful production by the German Reeds in 1869, followed by other revivals. It was later taken up by the D'Oyly Carte Opera Company, which played the piece repeatedly throughout Britain and overseas until 1977, and licensed it to numerous amateur companies. The opera continues to be performed regularly. A later musical adaptation, Daye and Knight, with libretto by Walter Parke and music by Louise Barone, was presented by the German Reed Entertainment at St George's Hall, London, in 1895. Both the lodgers in that version were young women. In 1885, there had been another musical treatment of the same plot, John and Jeanette, by L. Machele and J. Batchelder, but that version was based directly on Labiche and Lefranc's 1846 vaudeville Frisette, rather than on Box and Cox.

== Notes, references and sources ==
=== Sources ===
- Adams, W. Davenport (1904). A Dictionary of the Drama. London: Chatto and Windus. OCLC 1012840.
- Burnand, F. C. (1872). How we Managed our Private Theatricals. To which is added Penelope Anne, a Roaring Farce for Home Performance. New York: Happy Hours. OCLC 12097957.
- Gaye, Freda, ed. (1967). Who's Who in the Theatre (fourteenth ed.). London: Sir Isaac Pitman and Sons. OCLC 5997224.
- Jacobs, Arthur (1984). Arthur Sullivan: A Victorian Musician. Oxford: Oxford University Press. ISBN 0192820338.
- Pearce, Charles E. (1900). Madame Vestris and Her Times. London: Stanley Paul. OCLC 848554132.
- Rollins, Cyril; R. John Witts (1962). The D'Oyly Carte Opera Company in Gilbert and Sullivan Operas: A Record of Productions, 1875–1961. London: Michael Joseph. OCLC 504581419.
- Stiller, Jerry (2000). Married to Laughter. New York: Simon & Schuster. ISBN 0-7432-1146-4.
