= F. C. Burnand =

British comic writer and dramatist (1836–1917)

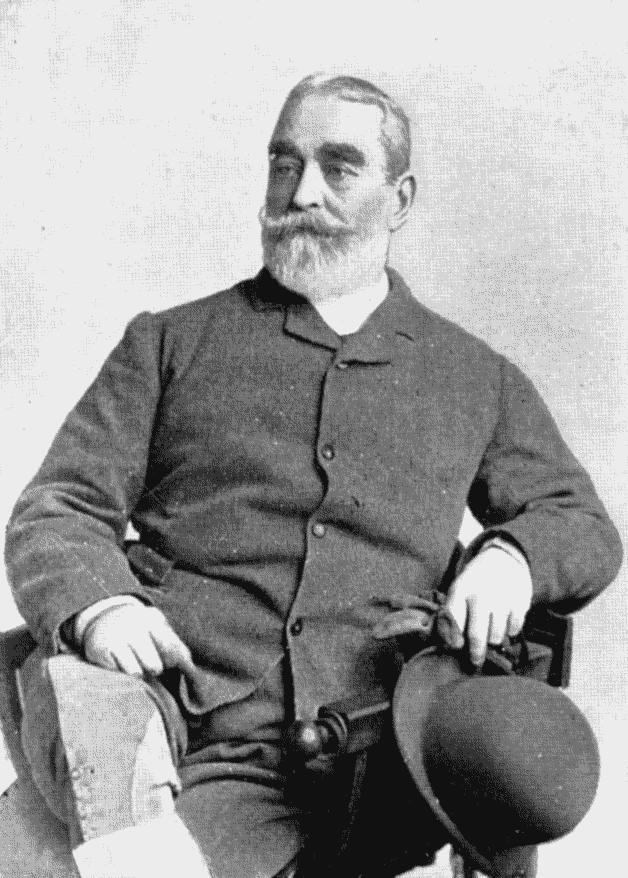
From The History of "Punch"

Sir Francis Cowley Burnand (29 November 1836 – 21 April 1917), usually known as F. C. Burnand, was an English comic writer and prolific playwright, best known today as the librettist of Arthur Sullivan's opera Cox and Box.

The son of a prosperous family, he was educated at Eton and Cambridge and was expected to follow a conventional career in the law or in the church, but he concluded that his vocation was the theatre. From his schooldays he had written comic plays, and from 1860 until the end of the 19th century, he produced a series of more than 200 Victorian burlesques, farces, pantomimes and other stage works. His early successes included the burlesques Ixion, or the Man at the Wheel (1863) and The Latest Edition of Black-Eyed Susan; or, the Little Bill that Was Taken Up (1866). Also in 1866, he adapted the popular farce Box and Cox as a comic opera, Cox and Box, with music by Sullivan. The piece became a popular favourite and was later frequently used by the D'Oyly Carte Opera Company as a curtain raiser; it remains regularly performed today.

By the 1870s, Burnand was generating a prodigious output of plays as well as comic pieces and illustrations for the humour magazine Punch. Among his 55-stage works during the decade was another frequently revived hit, Betsy (1879). For Punch, among other things, he wrote the popular column "Happy Thoughts", in which the narrator recorded the difficulties and distractions of everyday life. Also admired were his burlesques of other writers' works. Burnand was a contributor to Punch for 45 years and its editor from 1880 until 1906 and is credited with adding much to the popularity and prosperity of the magazine. His editorship of the original publication of The Diary of a Nobody by the brothers George and Weedon Grossmith was a high point of his tenure in 1888–89. Many of his articles were collected and published in book form. His stage successes in the 1890s included his English-language versions of two Edmond Audran operettas, titled La Cigale and Miss Decima (both in 1891). His last works included collaborations on pantomimes of Cinderella (1905) and Aladdin (1909).

Known generally for his genial wit and good humour, Burnand was nevertheless intensely envious of his contemporary W. S. Gilbert but was unable to emulate his rival's success as a comic opera librettist. In other forms of theatre Burnand was outstandingly successful, with his works receiving London runs of up to 550 performances and extensive tours in the British provinces and the US. He published several humorous books and memoirs and was knighted in 1902 for his work on Punch.

== Life and career ==
=== Early years ===
Burnand was born in central London, the only child of Francis Burnand and his first wife Emma, née Cowley, who died when her son was eight days old. Burnand senior, a stockbroker, was descended from an old Savoyard family, prominent in the silk trade; his wife was a descendant of the poet and dramatist Hannah Cowley.

Burnand was educated at Eton, where, aged fifteen, he wrote a farce, Guy Fawkes Day, played at Cookesley's house, and subsequently at the Theatre Royal, Worthing. While at Eton, he submitted some illustrations to the comic weekly magazine, Punch, one or two of which were published. In 1854 he went to Trinity College, Cambridge, where as an undergraduate he sought the approval of the Vice-Chancellor, Edwin Guest, of the establishment of a Cambridge University Amateur Dramatic Club, with a performance of Box and Cox. Guest and his colleagues refused their consent, but Burnand went ahead without it. The members of the club performed a triple bill under stage names to avoid retribution from the university. The club prospered (and continues to the present day); Burnand acted and wrote plays under the name Tom Pierce.

Burnand graduated in 1858. His family had expected that he would study for the bar, but the Burnands held the right to appoint the incumbent of a Church of England parish that became vacant, and it was agreed that he should train for the priesthood. He enrolled at Cuddesdon theological college, where his studies of divinity led him to leave the Anglican church and become a Roman Catholic. This caused a breach between Burnand and his father, but the estrangement did not last long. To the disappointment of Cardinal Manning, leader of the English Catholics, Burnand announced that his vocation was not for the church but for the theatre. Father and son were reconciled, and Burnand returned to his original plan of reading for the bar at Lincoln's Inn.

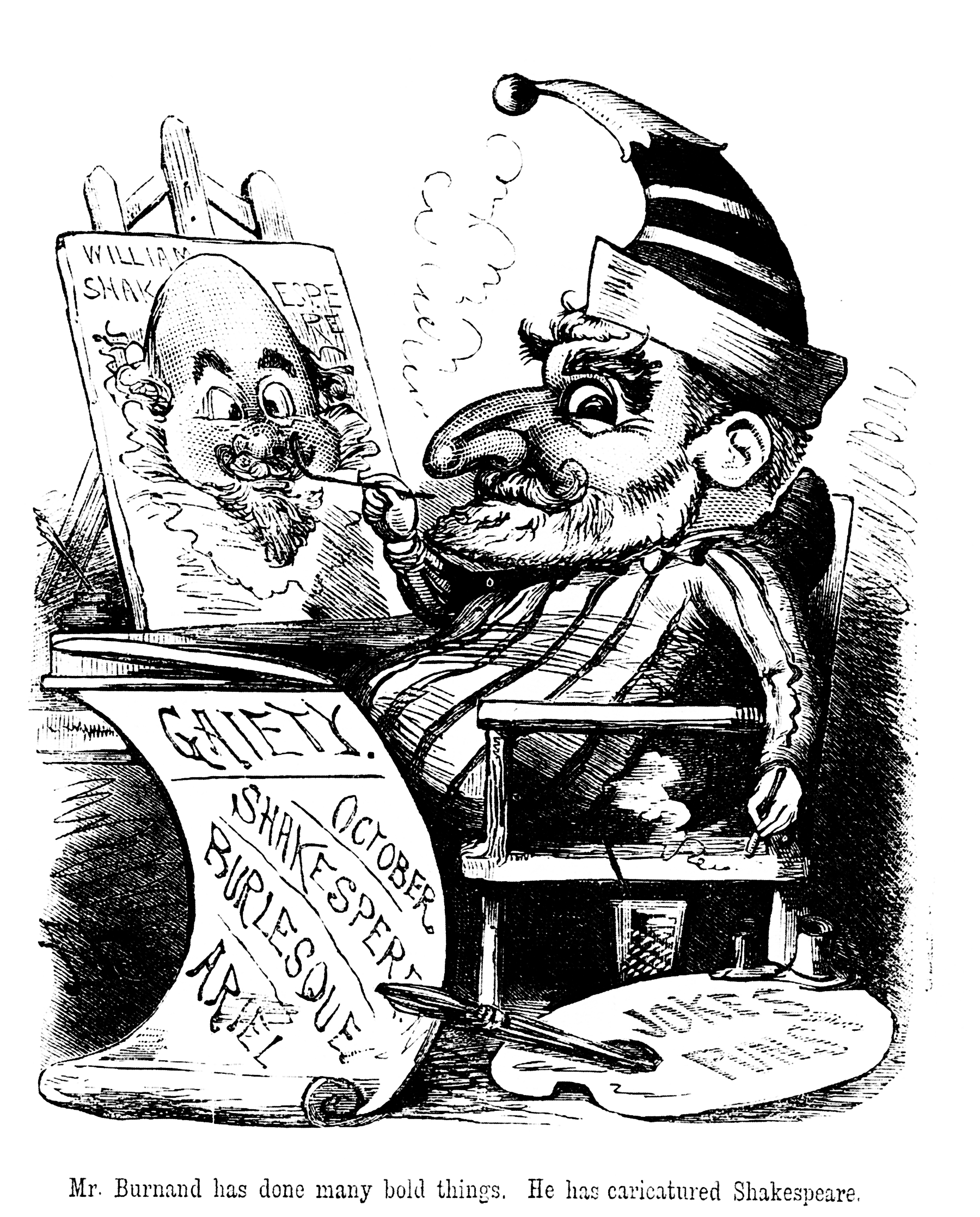
Burnand as Mr Punch, Punch's mascot

=== 1860s: start of writing career ===
In February 1860 Burnand had his first piece performed in the West End, Dido the Celebrated Widow, a musical burlesque of Dido and Aeneas, played at the St James's Theatre. The following month he married an actress, Cecilia Victoria Ranoe (1841–1870), daughter of James Ranoe, a clerk; the couple had five sons and two daughters. He was called to the bar in 1862, and practised for a short time, but his main interest was in writing. In the early 1860s he wrote several farces in partnership with Montagu Williams, and edited the short-lived journal The Glow-Worm. He then joined the staff of Fun, edited by H. J. Byron. He parted company with Byron when the magazine rejected his proposed 1863 literary burlesque of a Reynolds serial, entitled Mokeanna, or the White Witness. He showed his manuscript to Mark Lemon, editor of Punch, who accepted it for publication; Burnand remained a Punch writer for the rest of his career. (Note: W. S. Gilbert, later Burnand's rival as a comic playwright, made the opposite journey, severing his connection with Punch in favour of Fun when Lemon turned down one of Gilbert's Bab Ballads.)

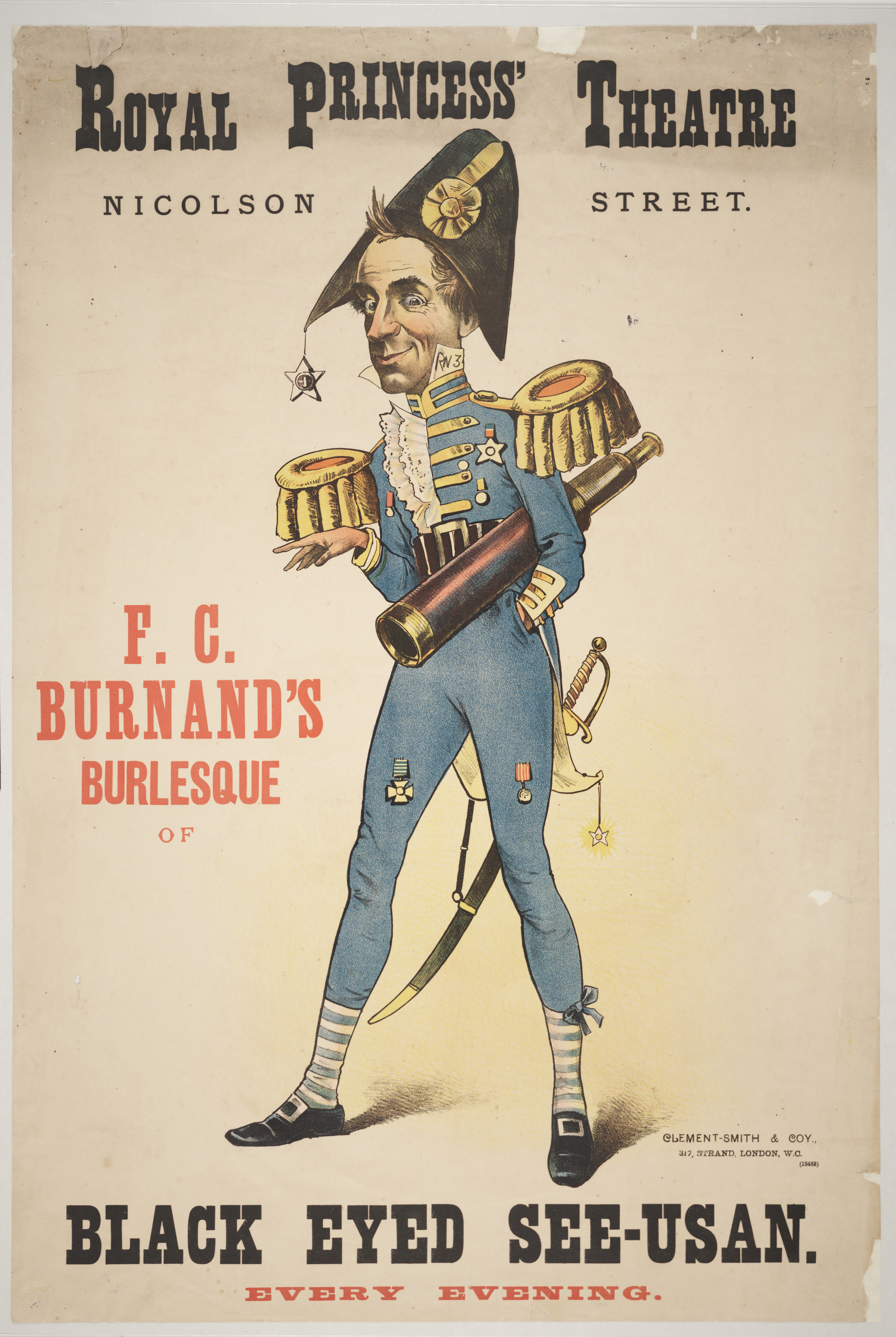
Theatre poster for Burnard's Black Eyed See-Usan

Dido was followed by The Îles of St Tropez (1860), Fair Rosamond (1862) and The Deal Boatman (1863), among many others. His most memorable early success was another musical burlesque, Ixion, or the Man at the Wheel (1863), starring Lydia Thompson in the title role, which found audiences on both sides of the Atlantic. By this time Burnand was a skilled negotiator with theatre managements, and he was among the first authors to insist on profit-sharing instead of fixed royalties. For Ixion this brought him a total of around £3,000. Other notable early works included an opéra bouffe, Windsor Castle (1865), with music by Frank Musgrave, and more pun-filled burlesques, including Helen, or, Taken from the Greek, and Guy Fawkes, or The Ugly Mug and the Couple of Spoons, both in 1866. Later in 1866 Burnand had a huge success with the burlesque The Latest Edition of Black-Eyed Susan; or, the Little Bill that Was Taken Up, parodying the three-act melodrama by Douglas Jerrold, Black-Eyed Susan; the show ran for 400 nights at the Royalty Theatre, was played for years provincially and in the US, and was twice revived in London.

In 1866, Burnand adapted the popular farce Box and Cox as a comic opera, Cox and Box, with music by the young composer Arthur Sullivan. The piece was written for a private performance but was repeated and given its first public performance at the Adelphi Theatre in 1867. The reviewer for Fun was W. S. Gilbert, who wrote

Mr Sullivan's music is, in many places, of too high a class for the grotesquely absurd plot to which it is wedded. It is very funny, here and there, and grand or graceful when it is not funny; but the grand and the graceful have, we think, too large a share of the honours to themselves."

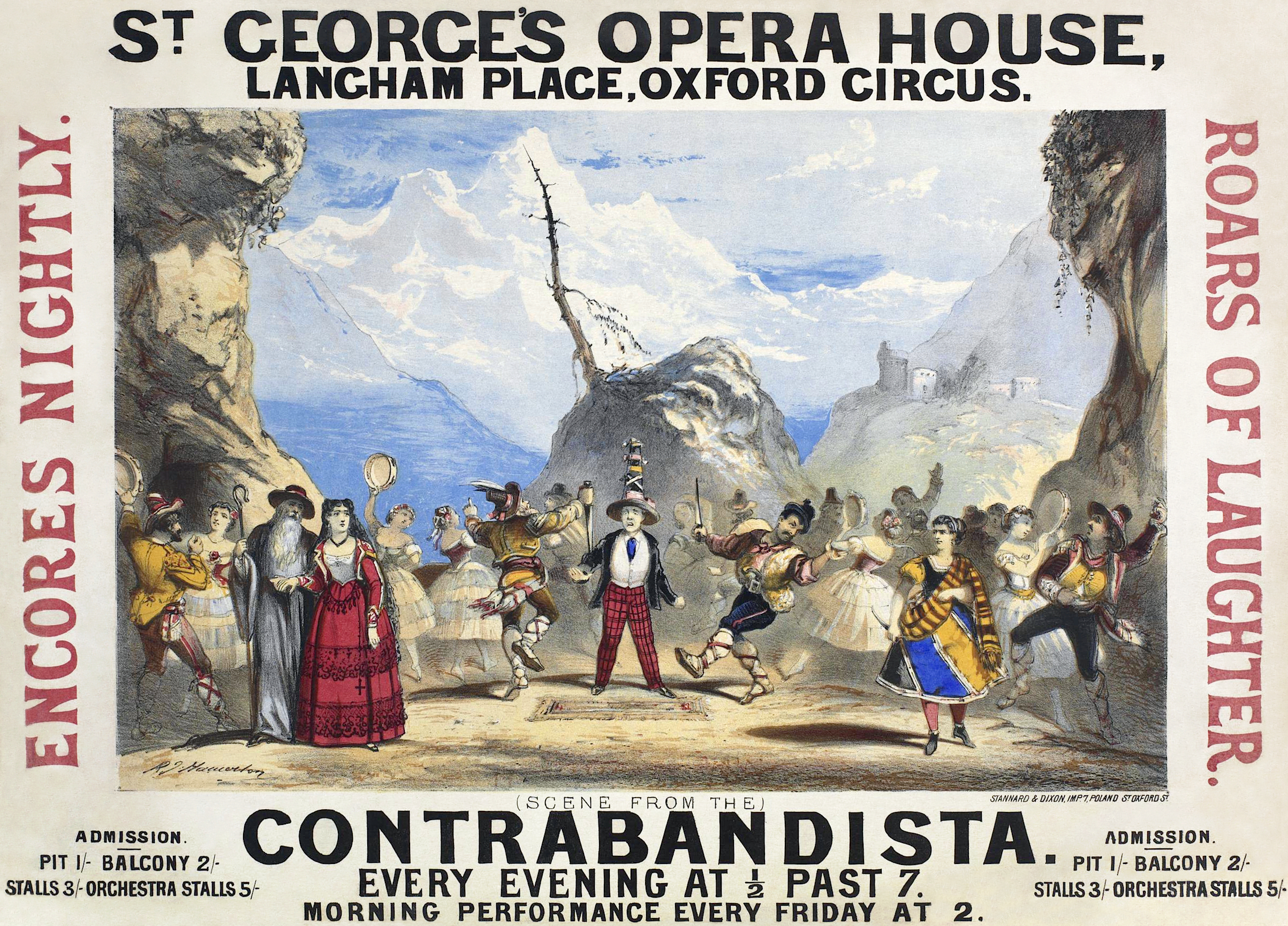
Poster for The Contrabandista

Cox and Box became a popular favourite and was frequently revived. It was the only work not by Gilbert in the regular repertory of the D'Oyly Carte Opera Company during the 20th century and is the only work of Burnand's still frequently staged. Its success encouraged its authors to write the two-act opera, The Contrabandista (1867), revised and expanded as The Chieftain (1894), but it did not achieve much popularity in either version.

More burlesques followed in 1868, including Fowl Play, or, A Story of Chicken Hazard and The Rise and Fall of Richard III, or, A New Front to an Old Dicky. In 1869, Burnand wrote The Turn of the Tide, which was a success at the Queen's Theatre, and six other stage works during the course of the year.

=== 1870s: prolific author ===
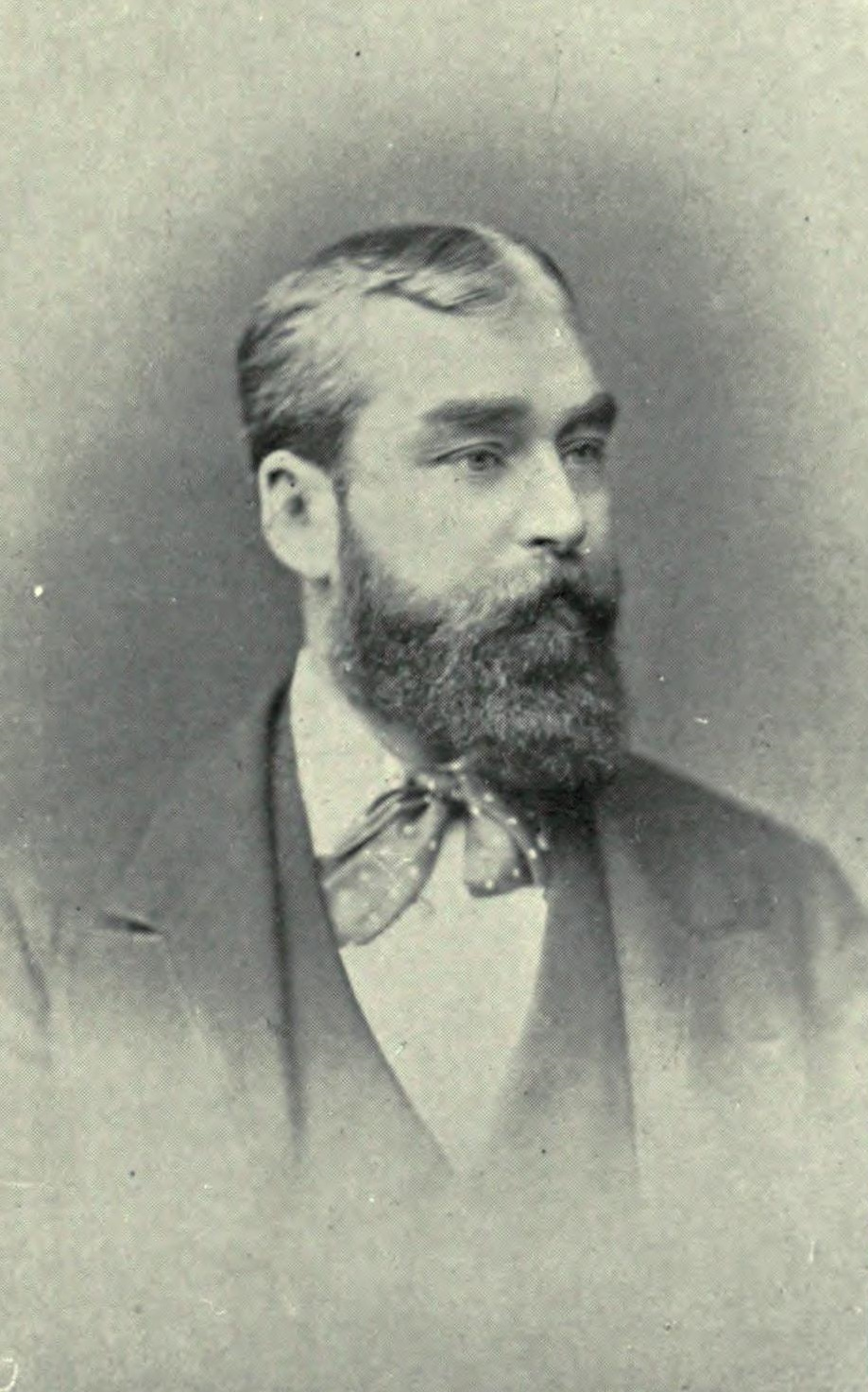
Burnand, c. 1870s

Burnand's wife Cecilia died in 1870 at age 28, leaving him with seven small children. In 1874 Burnand married her widowed sister, Rosina (d. 1924), who was also an actress. It was at that time illegal in England for a man to marry his dead wife's sister, (Note: This became legal in 1907 under the Deceased Wife's Sister's Marriage Act 1907.) although such marriages made outside British jurisdiction were recognised as valid; accordingly the wedding ceremony was performed in continental Europe. There were two sons and four daughters of this marriage.

Throughout the 1870s, Burnand maintained a prodigious output. For the stage he wrote 55 pieces, ranging from burlesques to pantomimes, farces and extravaganzas. He was the sole author of most of them, but worked on a few with Thomas German Reed, J. L. Molloy, Henry Pottinger Stephens and even with H. J. Byron. His stage pieces of the 1870s included Poll and Partner Joe (1871), Penelope Anne (1871; a sequel to Cox and Box), The Miller and His Man (1873; "a Christmas drawing room extravaganza" with songs by Sullivan), Artful Cards (1877), Proof (1878), Dora and Diplunacy (1878, a burlesque of Clement Scott's Diplomacy, an adaptation of Sardou's Dora), The Forty Thieves (1878; a charity collaboration among four playwrights, including Byron and Gilbert), Our Club (1878) and another frequently revived hit, Betsy (1879). He provided a burlesque of Robbing Roy to the Gaiety Theatre in 1879. Burnand's prolific writing came at some cost in quality. A biographer wrote that he "was a facile and slapdash writer. False rhymes and awkward rhythms occur frequently in his verse, and his favourite devices included puns, topical references and slang."

Burnand also translated or adapted for the London stage several French operettas by Offenbach, Edmond Audran, Charles Lecocq and Robert Planquette. At the same time as his busy theatrical career, he was a member of the staff of Punch under Lemon and his successors, Shirley Brooks and Tom Taylor, writing a regular stream of genial articles. His best-known work for the magazine was the column "Happy Thoughts", in which the narrator recorded the difficulties and distractions of everyday life. A. A. Milne considered it "one of the most popular series which has ever appeared in Punch"; alongside it, he rated as Burnand's best comic contributions his burlesques of other writers, such as "The New History of Sandford and Merton" (1872) and "Strapmore" by "Weeder" (1878). (Note: These parodied The History of Sandford and Merton by Thomas Day, a moralising work for children; and Strathmore, a novel by Ouida, in his burlesque of which Burnand parodied two genres: novels of high society and Italian peasant stories. Other authors whom he satirised included Victor Hugo, presented in Punch as "Fictor Nogo".)

=== 1880s: editor of Punch ===
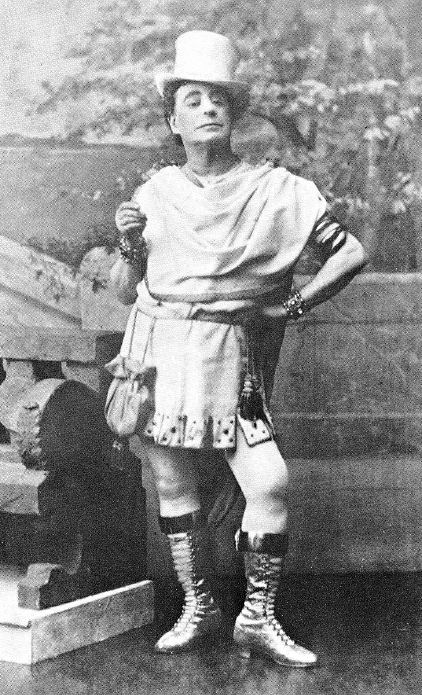
J. L. Toole in Burnand's Paw Claudian, 1884

The third editor of Punch, Tom Taylor, died in July 1880; the proprietors of the magazine appointed Burnand to succeed him. In Milne's view the magazine's reputation increased considerably under Burnand:

It grew less intolerant of opinions with which it disagreed; it became more catholic in its appeal; it began to discard its air of a Family Joke and aspired to be the National Institution which it has since been proclaimed. Yet he always kept for it a note of irresponsibility.

A later biographer, Jane Stedman, writes, "His predecessor, Tom Taylor, had allowed the paper to become heavy, but Burnand's rackety leadership brightened it." Burnand, who declared himself "hostile to no man's religion", banned Punch's previous anti-Catholicism, although he was unable to prevent some antisemitic jokes.

One of Burnand's biggest successes, both in Punch and on stage, was satire of the aesthetic movement. His play The Colonel (1881), based on The Serious Family, a play by Morris Barnett, ran for 550 performances and toured extensively. It made so much money for the actor-manager Edgar Bruce that he was able to build the Prince of Wales Theatre. Burnand rushed The Colonel into production to make sure that it opened several months before Gilbert and Sullivan's similarly themed comic opera, Patience, but Patience ran even longer than The Colonel. Oscar Wilde, no fan of Burnand's farces, wrote, in anticipation of seeing Patience: "With Gilbert and Sullivan I am sure we will have something better than the dull farce of The Colonel". For the Gaiety Theatre, Burnand wrote a burlesque of The Tempest entitled Ariel in October 1883, with music by Meyer Lutz, starring Nellie Farren and Arthur Williams. The Times complained of the "flatness and insipidity" of Burnand's text and of his vulgarising the original. The Observer was less censorious, finding the piece moderately amusing, and correctly predicting that it would run successfully until it had to make way for the annual Gaiety pantomime at Christmas.

In 1884, Burnand wrote Paw Claudian, a burlesque of the 1883 costume (Byzantine) drama Claudian by Henry Herman and W. G. Wills, presented at Toole's Theatre starring J. L. Toole. The same year, he wrote a burlesque of Black-Eyed Susan, called Black Eyed See-Usan, for the Alhambra Theatre. Burnand wrote several musical works around 1889 and 1890 with the composer Edward Solomon, including Pickwick, which was revived in 1894. Pickwick was recorded by Retrospect Opera in 2016, together with George Grossmith's Cups and Saucers. Other stage pieces included adaptations for Augustin Daly in New York.

=== Later years ===
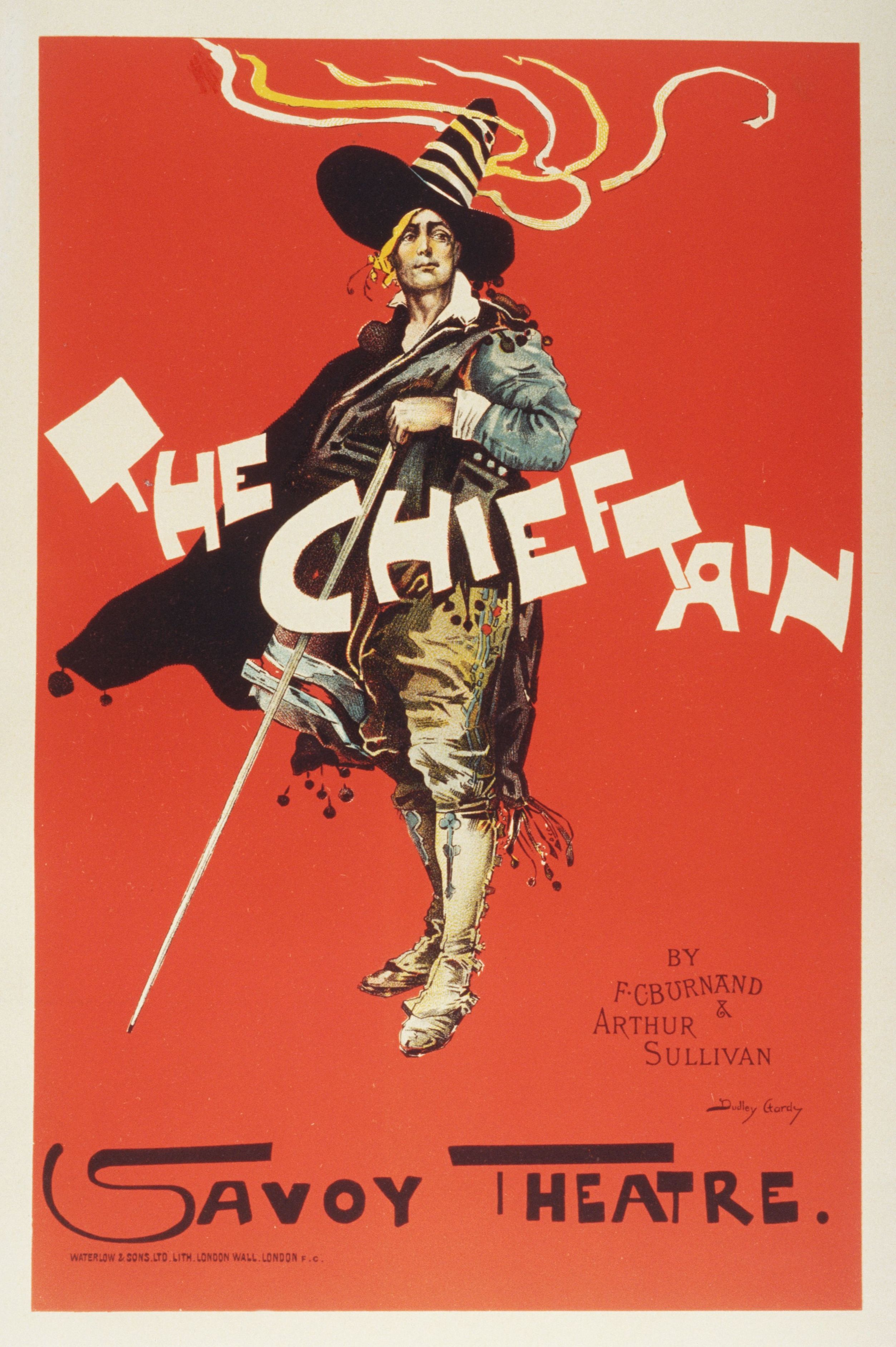
Poster for the original production of The Chieftain, 1894

In 1890, Burnand wrote Captain Therèse, followed later that year by a very successful English version of Audran's operetta, La cigale et la fourmi (the grasshopper and the ant) retitled La Cigale, with additional music by Ivan Caryll. In 1891, he produced an English adaptation of Audran's Miss Helyett, retitled as Miss Decima. Burnand's The Saucy Sally premiered in 1892, and Mrs Ponderbury's Past played in 1895. He was knighted by King Edward VII at Buckingham Palace in 1902, for his work on Punch.

Burnand's 1897 comic opera, His Majesty, with music by Alexander Mackenzie, failed despite the contributions of the lyricist Adrian Ross and a Savoy Theatre cast including Ilka Pálmay, George Grossmith and Walter Passmore. The blame was generally held to be Burnand's. The Times commented, "Mr Burnand's experience as a librettist of comic opera, and Sir Alexander Mackenzie's inexperience in this class of composition might lead the public to expect a brilliant book weighed down by music of too serious and ambitious a type. The exact opposite is the case." Burnand's libretto was judged dull and confused, but Mackenzie's music was "marked by distinction as well as humour." Stedman comments that Burnand's conviction that he, not Gilbert, should have been Sullivan's main collaborator defied the facts: The Chieftain, his rewrite of The Contrabandista with Sullivan, ran for only 97 performances in 1894, and His Majesty managed only 61 performances. Nevertheless, Burnand used his position as editor of Punch to print antagonistic reviews of the plays of Gilbert and refused to give the Gilbert and Sullivan operas reviews in the magazine.

Burnand's last stage works were a collaboration with J. Hickory Wood, at the Theatre Royal, Drury Lane in 1905, on a pantomime of Cinderella, and he was partly responsible for a pantomime of Aladdin for the same theatre in 1909. His later contributions to Punch became increasingly wordy and anecdotal, relying on far-fetched puns, but he was a good judge of talent, and under him the paper prospered. Stedman rates as a high point of his editorship the publication of The Diary of a Nobody by the brothers George and Weedon Grossmith, which was soon turned into book form and has never been out of print. He was reluctant to retire, but was persuaded to do so in 1906, and was succeeded by Owen Seaman. In 1908, Burnand became the editor of The Catholic Who's Who, published by Burns & Oates.

Burnand's grave at St Augustine's Abbey

Burnand lived for much of his life in Ramsgate, Kent, on the south coast of England and was a member of the Garrick Club in London. He had a very large circle of friends and colleagues who included William Makepeace Thackeray, Mark Lemon and most writers, dramatists and actors of the day. George Grossmith wrote:

I think Frank Burnand is the most amusing man to meet. He is brimful of good humour. He will fire off joke after joke, and chaff you out of your life if he gets a chance. His chaff is always good-tempered. No one minds being chaffed by Burnand. I will not sing a song when he is in the room if I can possibly help it. He will sit in front of me at the piano, and either stare with a pained and puzzled look during my comic song, or he will laugh in the wrong places, or, what is worse still, take out his pocket-handkerchief and weep."

After a winter of bronchitis, Burnand died in 1917 at his home in Ramsgate, at the age of 80. He was buried in the cemetery at St Augustine's Abbey in Ramsgate.

=== Books ===
Burnand's best-known book, Happy Thoughts, was originally published in Punch in 1863–64 and frequently reprinted. This was followed by My Time and What I've Done with It (1874); Personal Reminiscences of the A.D.C., Cambridge, (1880); The Incomplete Angler (1887); Very Much Abroad (1890); Rather at Sea (1890); Quite at Home (1890); The Real Adventures of Robinson Crusoe (1893); The ZZG or Zig Zag Guide Round and About the Bold and Beautiful Kentish Coast, illustrated by Phil May (1897); Records and Reminiscences, (1904); and The Fox's Frolic: or, a day with the topsy turvy hunt, illustrated by Harry B. Neilson (1917).

== Notes and references ==
Notes

== Sources ==
- Burnand, F C (1880). The "A.D.C.", being personal reminiscences of the University Amateur Dramatic Club, Cambridge. London: Chapman and Hall. OCLC 9281323.
- Grossmith, George (1888). A Society Clown: Reminiscences. Bristol and London: Arrowsmith. OCLC 8060335.
- Lee, Elizabeth (1914). Ouida: a memoir. London: Unwin. OCLC 3812858.
- Nicoll, Allardyce (1953). A History of English Drama – Vol 5, Late Nineteenth Century Drama 1850–1900 (second ed.). Cambridge: Cambridge University Press. ISBN 9780521129367. OCLC 217979088.
- Parker, John (1914). Who's Who in the Theatre (second ed.). London: Pitman.
- Rollins, Cyril; R John Witts (1961). The D'Oyly Carte Opera Company in Gilbert and Sullivan Operas. London: Michael Joseph. OCLC 1317843.
- Spielmann, M H (1895). The History of Punch. London, Paris and Melbourne: Cassell. OCLC 1925026.
- Wilde, Oscar (2000). Merlin Holland; Rupert Hart-Davis (eds.). Complete Letters. New York: Henry Holt. ISBN 0-8050-5915-6.
- Young, Percy M. (1971). Sir Arthur Sullivan. London: J M Dent & Sons. ISBN 0-460-03934-2.
