= Walt Witcover =

American actor and director from New York

Walter Witcover Scheinman (August 24, 1924 – November 15, 2013) was an American actor, director, and acting teacher born in New York City. His parents were Louis J. Scheinman, a sculptor and composer, and Juliette T. Benton, a critic and lecturer. He received a BA and MA from Cornell University and served in World War II.

Witcover studied acting under his mentor Lee Strasberg, as well as with Herbert Berghof, and Curt Conway. As director, three of his Off-Broadway productions won Obie Awards. He taught acting and directing at Berghof's HB Studio for twenty-five years and was Professor of Theatre Arts at the State University of New York at Purchase Theatre Arts program, and at the University of Maryland, Baltimore County. He also was co-founder and artistic director of Masterworks Laboratory Theatre (MLT). He later founded the Witcover Acting Studio in New York City. He directed plays featuring Jane Alexander, Dominic Chianese, Jerry Stiller, Lee Marvin and Ernest Borgnine, among many others.

His students have included Barbara Barrie, Ernest Borgnine, Lance Henriksen, Christine Lahti, Tony Musante, Robert Clohessy, Liz Larsen, William Youmans.

== Early life ==
Walt grew up in New York City and Kew Gardens, Queens.

He was lifelong friends with photographer Richard Avedon, whom he'd known since early childhood.

== Stage Works (as director) ==
- Once Upon a Hill and The Second Shepherds' Play, both at Cornell University, 1946.
- The Philadelphia Story, Kind Lady, and Arsenic and Old Lace, all at the Manor Club Theatre, Pelham, NY, 1949.
- The Hasty Heart, Barter Theatre, 1949.
- Light Up the Sky, Manor Club Theatre, 1950.
- Once Upon a Hill, Cornell University, 1950.
- Peter Rabbit, An Airman's Dream, and Ten Little Indians, all at Landsberg Air Force Base, Germany, 1951.
- The Stages of Love, Equity Library Theatre, New York City, 1953.
- The Moon Is Blue, John Loves Mary, and I Am a Camera, Old Town Theatre, Smithtown, NY, 1953.
- The Hasty Heart, Equity Library Theatre, New York City, 1954.
- The Little Red Shoes, Children's World Theatre, New York City, 1954.
- Maedchen in Uniform, Equity Library Theatre, New York City, 1955.
- The Sun-Dial, White Barn Theatre, Westport, CT, 1955.
- Three Times Three (How He Lied to Her Husband, Box and Cox, John John, Tib and Father John) with Jerry Stiller, Anne Meara and Charles Nelson Reilly, Chanin Auditorium, New York City, 1956.
- Tea and Sympathy, The Solid Gold Cadillac, The Philadelphia Story, and Picnic, Legion Star Playhouse, Ephrata, PA, 1956.
- Exiles, Renata Theatre, New York City, 1957.
- Red Roses for Me, Stella Adler Studio Theatre, New York City, 1957.
- The Glass Menagerie, Overruled, How He Lied to Her Husband, Rocket to the Moon, The Marriage, and Thieves' Carnival, Crystal Lake Theatre, Chestertown, NY, 1959.
- Born Yesterday, Club Arena Theatre, Washington, DC, 1960.
- Three Modern Noh Plays, White Barn Theatre, Westport, CT, 1960.
- Two Modern Noh Plays, ANTA Matinee Series, Theater de Lys, New York City, 1960.
- An Evening with Italian Writers, Brooklyn Public Library, New York City, 1960–61.
- Signs Along the Cynic Route, Actors Studio Theatre, New York City, 1962.
- Talk to Me, Herbert Berghof Studio Theatre, New York City, 1963.
- The Fantasticks, Bermudiana Hotel Theatre, Bermuda, 1964.
- The Exhaustion of Our Son's Love, Sheridan Square Theatre, New York City, 1964.
- What Color Goes with Brown?, Theatre '65, New York City, 1964.
- One of Us Has Been Ignited, Actors Studio Theatre, New York City, 1965.
- The Exhaustion of Our Son's Love, Cherry Lane Theatre, New York City, 1965.
- La Traviata, Act I, Actors Studio Theatre, New York City, 1966.
- Judas Maccabaeus, Long Island Cultural Festival Theatre, NY, 1966.
- The Rivals and La Traviata, Act II, both Actors Studio Theatre New York City, 1967.
- La Traviata, Act II, Sloane House Young Men's Christian Association (YMCA) Theatre, New York City, 1968.
- The Miser, Syracuse Repertory Theatre, NY, 1968.
- La Traviata, Acts I and II, Actors Studio Theatre, New York City, 1968.
- Next Year in Jerusalem, Herbert Berghof Playwrights Foundation Theatre, New York City, 1968.
- La Traviata, Acts III and IV, Actors Studio Theatre, New York City, 1969.
- Experiments in Lyric Theatre, MLT, Theatre-in-the-Courthouse, New York City, 1970.
- From the World of Young Chekhov and Boubouroche!, MLT, Theatre-in-the-Courthouse, New York City, 1971.
- Marriage, with the Masterworks Laboratory Theatre at the Madison Avenue Baptist Church, New York City, 1972.
- Lyric Theatre '72, MLT, Lolly's Theatre Club, New York City, 1972.
- A Serving of Verse and Mozart as Dramatist, MLT, Brooklyn Heights, NY, 1973.
- A Serving of Verse, Emelin Theatre, Mamaroneck, NY, 1973.
- Salon-Comedie and Lovelives, MLT, Spencer Church, Brooklyn Heights, NY, 1974.
- The Gondoliers, MLT, Spencer Church, Brooklyn Heights, NY, 1975.
- Lessons in Love and West of Galway, MLT, Spencer Church, Brooklyn Heights, NY, 1976.
- The Forced Marriage MLT, Spencer Church, Brooklyn Heights, NY, 1977.
- Brothers and Lovers, State University of New York, Purchase, NY, 1978.
- Yellow Jack, and American Journeys, State University of New York, Purchase, NY, 1979;
- The Bourgeois Gentleman, A Midsummer Night's Dream, and The Other World of Anton Chekhov, State University of New York, Purchase, NY, 1980.
- Brief Chronicles of the Time, Actors Studio Theatre, New York City, 1982.
- The Misanthrope, MLT, St. Peter's Performing Arts Center, New York City, 1983.
- The Miser, University of Maryland, College Park, 1983.
- She Stoops to Conquer, Virginia Technical College Theatre, Blacksburg, 1984.
- Domestic Relations MLT, MLT Studio Theater, 1993
- Domestic Relations, MLT, Theatre Outback @ Howard Community College, MD, 1994.
- How He Lied to Her Husband and Box and Cox, MLT, MLT Studio Theater, 1998.
- Gilbert Without Sullivan
- A Serving of Verse

== Publications ==
- Living on Stage: Acting from the Inside Out: A Practical Process, 2004.
- My Road, Less Traveled: Becoming an Actor, a Director, a Teacher, 2011.
