= Black-Eyed Susan =

Comic play written by Douglas Jerrold

Black-Eyed Susan; or, All in the Downs
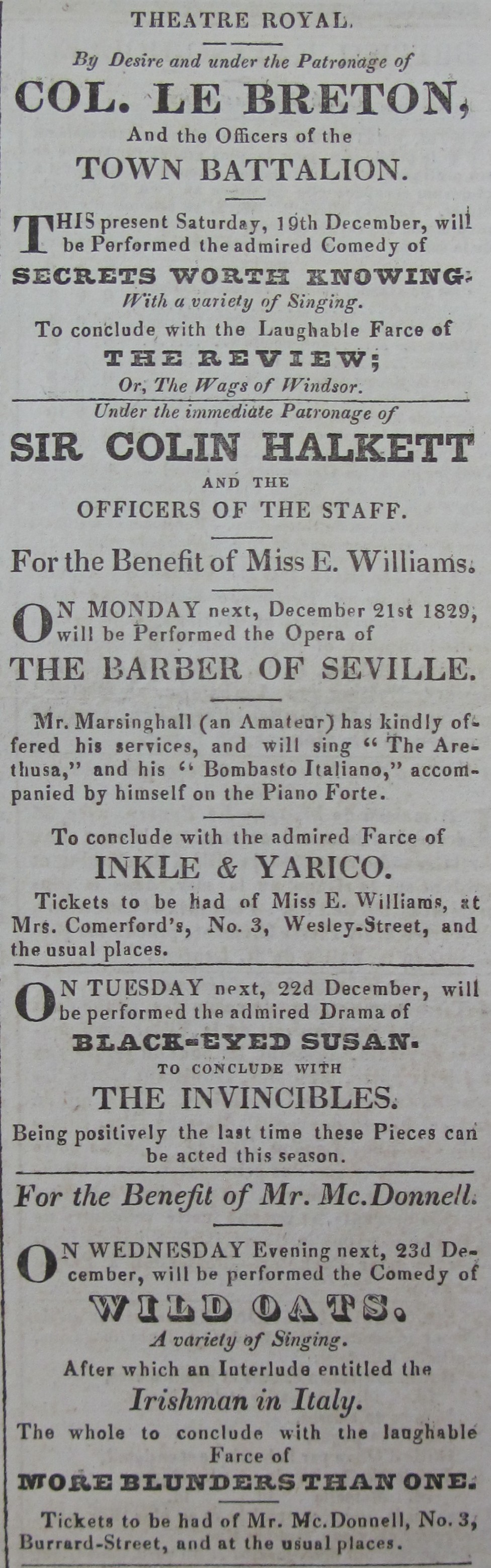
- Black-Eyed Susan on the bill of the Theatre Royal, Jersey, in December 1829
- Written by: Douglas William Jerrold

Premiere
- Date: June 8, 1829
- Place: Surrey Theatre, London

Black-Eyed Susan; or, All in the Downs is a comic play in three acts by Douglas Jerrold. The story concerns a heroic sailor, William, who has been away from Britain for three years fighting in the Napoleonic Wars. Meanwhile, his wife, Susan, has fallen on hard times and is being harassed by her crooked landlord uncle. A smuggler named Hatchet offers to pay her debts because he wants her for himself; he tries to persuade her that William is dead. Soon after William returns to solve this problem, his drunken, dastardly captain tries to seduce Susan. William, not recognising his captain from behind, strikes him with his cutlass. He is court-martialled for attacking a senior officer and sentenced to be hanged. But it turns out that he had been discharged from the navy before he struck his captain, so all ends well. Much of the humour in the piece centers on the sailor's nautical dialect, combined with his noble character. The play is a nautical melodrama (with all its stock characters) that praises the patriotic British tar (sailor) while critiquing authoritarianism in the British Navy. Aspects of the story were later parodied in H.M.S. Pinafore (1878).

The play was Jerrold's first big success, premiering on 8 June 1829 at the Surrey Theatre and running for a new record of over 150 performances. Britain at the time was recovering from the fallout of the Napoleonic Wars and was in the midst of a class war involving the Corn laws, and a reform movement, which resulted in the Reform Act 1832 aimed at reducing corruption. Black-Eyed Susan consisted of various extreme stereotypes representing the forces of good, evil, the innocent and the corrupt, the poor and the rich, woven into a serious plot with comic sub-plots. Its topical subject contributed to the play's enormous success. T. P. Cooke starred as William, the nautical hero, becoming a star, and the producer, Robert William Elliston, became rich. The piece played simultaneously at Covent Garden Theatre for part of the original run, and soon after it closed at the Surrey, it was revived at the Theatre Royal, Drury Lane, for a total run of over 300 nights, which was extraordinarily successful for the time. After this, it was frequently revived.

The play was revived at the Warehouse Theatre in Croydon in 1986, and the same production played at the Playhouse Oxford in 1987. It was directed by Ted Craig and designed by Michael Pavelka. The cast included Simon Slater, Rita Wolf and Burt Caesar. The piece was given a 2007 revival at the Theatre Royal, Bury St Edmunds. The play was made into a 1914 film directed by Maurice Elvey. Among the numerous Victorian burlesques and later parody versions of the play was an 1884 version by F. C. Burnand called Black Eyed See-Usan, first produced at the Alhambra Theatre.

== Characters ==
- Doggrass, a wealthy publican
- Gnatbrain, a gardener and waterman
- Tom Hatchet, a smuggler who covets Susan
- Jacob Twig, a ploughboy turned bailiff
- Susan, married to William and niece to Doggrass
- Dolly Mayflower, a spinner in love with Gnatbrain
- William, a sailor married to Susan
- Blue Peter, a sailor
- Ploughshare, a farm labourer
- Lieutenant Pike, of William's ship
- Captain Robert Crosstree, of William’s ship
- The Admiral, in charge of the court martial
- Master at Arms
- Country girls and sailors
