= Henry Lytton =

British actor and singer (1865–1936)

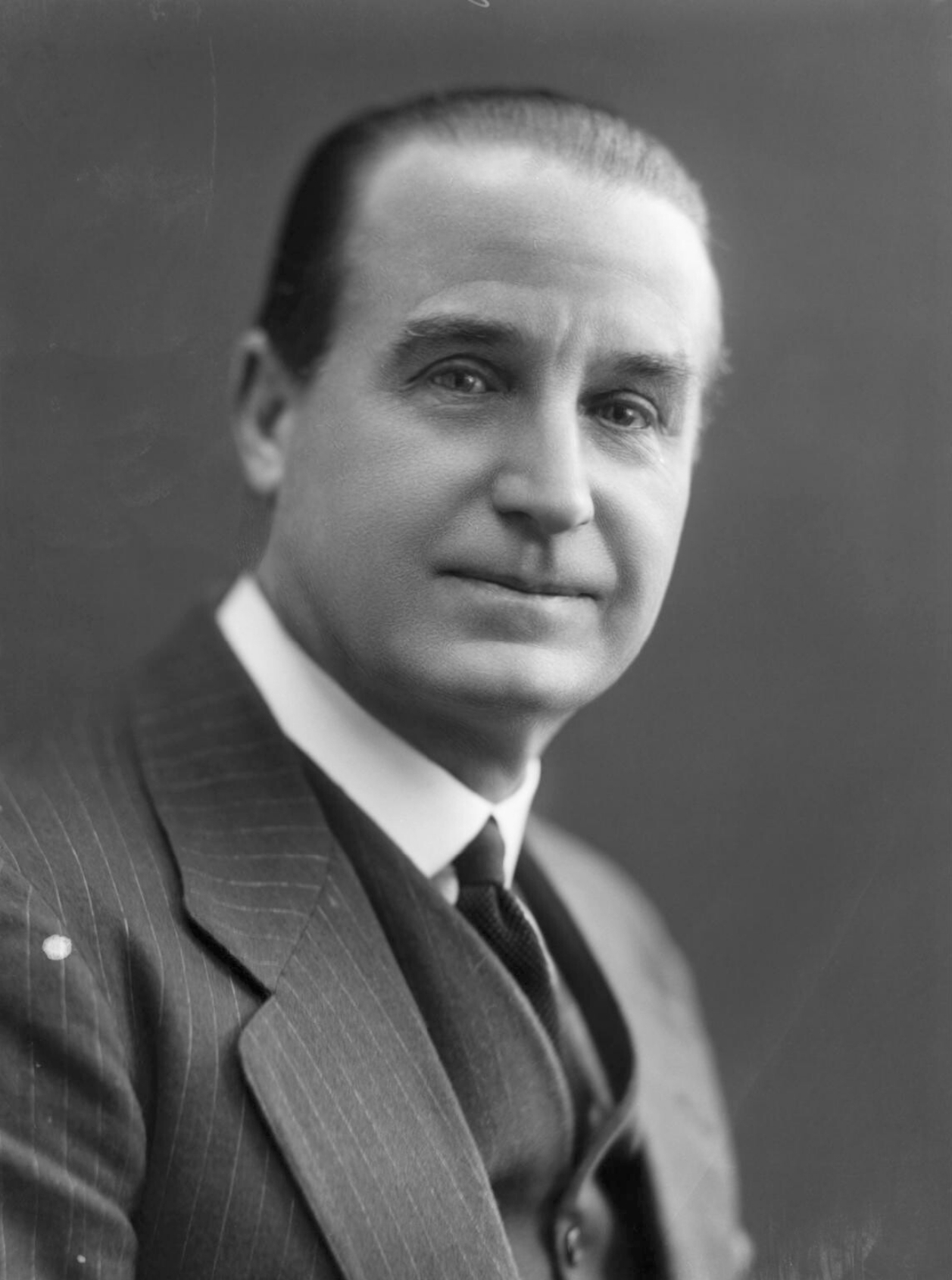
Lytton in 1919

Sir Henry Lytton (born Henry Alfred Jones; 3 January 1865 – 15 August 1936) was an English actor and singer who was the leading exponent of the starring comic patter-baritone roles in Gilbert and Sullivan operas from 1909 to 1934. He also starred in musical comedies. His career with the D'Oyly Carte Opera Company spanned 50 years, and he is the only performer ever knighted for achievements in Gilbert and Sullivan roles.

Lytton was born in London; he studied there with a painter but then went on the stage in defiance of his family's wishes. At the age of 19 he married Louie Henri, an actress and singer who helped him gain a place in a D'Oyly Carte touring company in 1884. After briefly playing in other companies, he and his wife rejoined D'Oyly Carte. He had an early breakthrough in 1887 when the Savoy Theatre star George Grossmith fell ill, and the 22-year-old Lytton went on for him in Ruddigore. Lytton starred in D'Oyly Carte touring companies from 1887 to 1897, playing mostly the comic patter roles in the Gilbert and Sullivan (and other) operas. From 1897 to 1903 he appeared with the company continuously at the Savoy Theatre, playing a range of baritone parts, from romantic leads to character parts in new operas and revivals. During this time his brief and costly attempt at theatrical production in London led to his abandoning thoughts of being an impresario.

The D'Oyly Carte company left the Savoy Theatre in 1903, and Lytton appeared in half a dozen West End musical comedies over the next four years, including The Earl and the Girl, The Spring Chicken and The Little Michus. He also wrote for, and performed in, music hall and wrote a libretto. During the two D'Oyly Carte repertory seasons at the Savoy between 1906 and 1909, Lytton rejoined the company, again playing a variety of baritone roles, but mostly not the principal comedian patter roles.

Beginning in 1909, and continuously to 1934, he was the principal comedian of the D'Oyly Carte Opera Company in London and on tour. He retired from acting a year later.

== Life and career ==
=== Early years ===
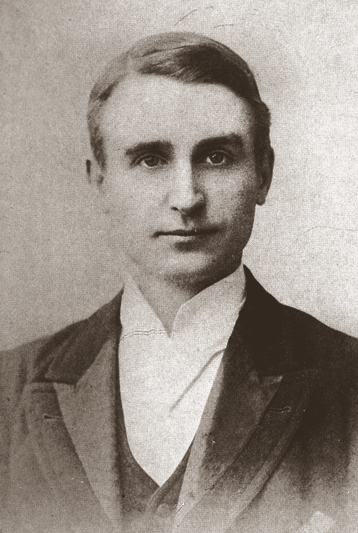
Lytton aged 21

Lytton was born as Henry Alfred Jones on 3 January 1865 in Pembroke Square, Kensington, London, the son of Henry Jones (1829–1893), a jeweller, and his second wife Martha Lavinia, née Harris. According to his highly unreliable memoirs (Note: In his memoirs, The Secrets of a Savoyard (1922) and A Wandering Minstrel (1933) Lytton ignored or embroidered the facts, maintaining that he was born in 1867 and was brought up under the tutelage of a guardian living in a country village. He also claimed to have married at the age of 17 while still a schoolboy; the records show that he was 19.) he was educated at St Mark's School, Chelsea, and took part there in amateur theatricals and boxing. He studied art with the painter W. H. Trood. It is unclear whether the studies were part-time or full time, or during his schooldays or later.

In 1881 Lytton made his first appearance on the professional stage at the Philharmonic Theatre, Islington, in the comic opera A Trip to China, or The Obstinate Bretons, in the cast of which was his future wife, Louie Henri, daughter of William Webber, of London. (Note: In his memoirs Lytton omits mention of this (giving the date of his stage debut as 1884) and purports that he first encountered Henri when going with Trood to see the opéra comique Olivette, in which she appeared at the Avenue Theatre in early 1883, and falling instantly for her.) They married in early 1884, both aged 19, at St Mary Abbots church, Kensington. Lytton was estranged from his father, who disapproved of Lytton's and Henri's profession, and neither family attended the ceremony.

Henri played an important part in Lytton's early theatrical career, coaching him in acting, and playing the piano to help him learn his musical parts. (Note: Lytton's inability to read music is among the reasons why his biographer Brian Jones doubts that he was schooled at St Mark's, a highly musical school, where it was "impossible for a boy to go through St Mark's in the 1870s without having music drummed in − the inspectorate examined the ability of each whole class to read music".) In February 1884 the two joined one of the impresario Richard D'Oyly Carte's touring companies. She played the small role of Ada in the first provincial tour of Gilbert and Sullivan's Princess Ida; he sang in the chorus and understudied the principal comic role of King Gama. According to his memoirs, Henri had obtained an audition for him, passing him off as her brother – "H. A. Henri" – in the mistaken belief that married couples were not welcome in Carte's companies. Any pretence was quickly abandoned, but Lytton kept the stage name Henri until 1887. Henri and Lytton rejoined the D'Oyly Carte tour when it resumed in February 1885, continuing until May. The tour ended in December, and the following month the couple's first child, Ida Louise, was born. After this, they joined with other out-of-work actors and travelled from town to town in Surrey for just over two months, performing a drama (All of Her), a comedy (Masters and Servants), and Charles Dibdin's ballad opera The Waterman. Lytton's memoirs record that they made little money, and the struggling young actors sometimes went hungry. Between theatrical engagements Lytton took odd jobs, including putting his artistic training to use by painting decorative plaques. He was taken on by another of Carte's touring companies from September to December 1885, after which he and Henri were in the 1885 Christmas pantomime at the Theatre Royal, Manchester. In May 1886 they were in the chorus of The Lily of Leoville in Birmingham, and then of Erminie at the Comedy Theatre, London.

At the end of 1886 Lytton was engaged by Carte to appear at the Savoy Theatre. Eric Lewis, who had been understudying George Grossmith in the starring comic patter roles since 1882, left the D'Oyly Carte company. Lytton was appointed to replace him, understudying the role of Robin Oakapple in the new Savoy opera, Ruddigore, (Note: The opera was titled Ruddygore until 2 February.) which opened on 22 January 1887. A week later Grossmith fell ill. Between 31 January and 15 February, Lytton appeared in the role. When he went back to the chorus on Grossmith's return, the dramatist W. S. Gilbert presented him with a gold-mounted walking stick in appreciation of his performance. At Gilbert's suggestion, he changed his stage name from H. A. Henri to Henry A. Lytton. (Note: The D'Oyly Carte stage director J. M. Gordon said that Gilbert suggested the name in memory of the actress Marie Litton who had died young three years earlier.)

=== Principal comedian on tour 1887 to 1897 ===
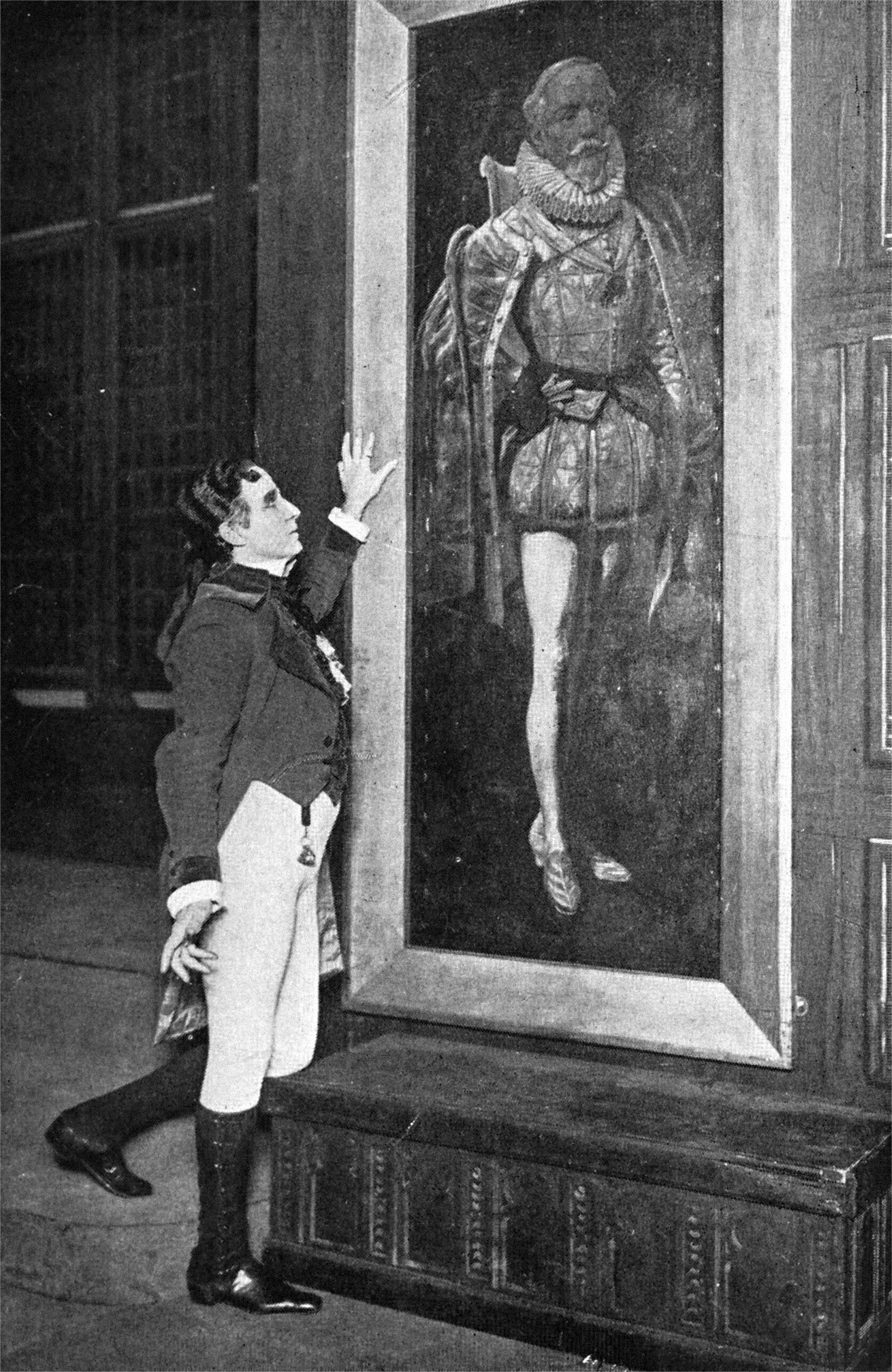
Lytton as Sir Ruthven (Robin Oakapple) in Ruddigore, 1920 revival

From April 1887 Lytton played Robin in his own right in two of Carte's touring companies, the first performing in medium-sized towns and the second in the major provincial cities. He received good notices, more for his acting than his singing. One reviewer wrote, "Mr Henry A. Lytton, though not shining as a vocalist, was in every way an admirable Robin Oakapple"; another praised the "light but masterly touch" with which he transformed himself from the innocent Robin of Act 1 to the bad baronet of Act 2. On tour Lytton gradually added to his repertoire the comic patter roles in many of the other Gilbert and Sullivan operas, beginning with Sir Joseph Porter in H.M.S. Pinafore (1887), the Major General in The Pirates of Penzance, Ko-Ko in The Mikado and Jack Point in The Yeomen of the Guard (all 1888). He later described Point as his favourite part. The creator of the role, Grossmith, was celebrated as a comic performer and did not emphasise the tragic side of the part; both Lytton and his colleague George Thorne in another touring company did so, portraying Point's collapse at the end as fatal. Gilbert and Carte approved, and the interpretation became standard. (Note: In a 1994 history of the D'Oyly Carte company Tony Joseph states that Lytton sought the sole credit for the more serious interpretation, but Lytton specifically acknowledged in The Secrets of a Savoyard that he was not the first to think of it and that his colleague presented the tragic interpretation first.)

In 1890 Lytton played the Duke of Plaza-Toro in the new Savoy opera, The Gondoliers, on tour and on Broadway, where Carte sent him with other D'Oyly Carte principals, to bolster the weak cast of the original New York production. After returning to Britain he added another of Grossmith's old roles to his repertory, playing the Lord Chancellor in Iolanthe. In the first provincial production of Utopia, Limited (1893) he played King Paramount – the main baritone part – created at the Savoy by Rutland Barrington. He played the title role in The Sorcerer and Bunthorne in Patience for the first time in 1895, and later in 1895 King Gama in Princess Ida, finally appearing in the role he had understudied in his first season with D'Oyly Carte eleven years earlier. In 1896 he toured as Ludwig in the final Gilbert and Sullivan opera, The Grand Duke.

In most of these provincial tours Lytton's wife was a fellow member of the company. During them he also appeared in Savoy operas by librettists or composers other than Gilbert and Sullivan, playing the title role in The Vicar of Bray (1892), Flapper in Billie Taylor (1893: "Mr Henry A. Lytton scored immensely by his clever impersonation of Captain the Hon. Felix Flapper, R.N, – his efforts were rewarded by sustained applause and laughter"), Bobinet in Mirette (1895) and Peter Grigg in The Chieftain (1895).

=== The Savoy: 1897 to 1903 ===
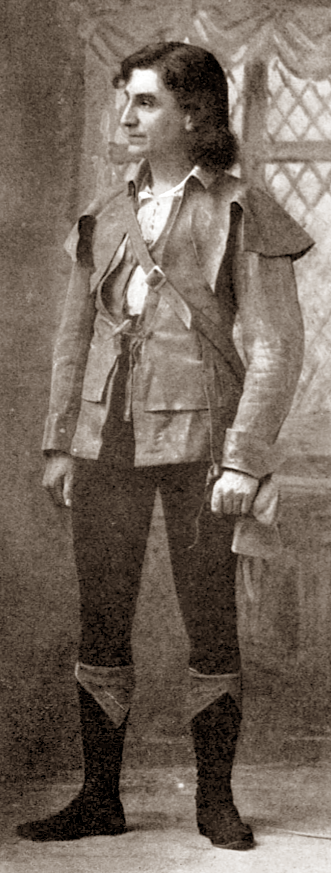
As Simon Limal in The Beauty Stone, 1898

Lytton was called to London in 1897 to play King Ferdinand in the new Savoy opera, His Majesty. He was an emergency replacement for Grossmith who had returned to the Savoy after nine years to star in the piece, but had withdrawn from the production in the first week of the run, pleading ill health. Lytton's performance won critical approval, but the piece did not please the public and was withdrawn after sixty-one performances. Such comedy as there was in His Majesty was given to the performer Walter Passmore. He had succeeded Grossmith as the Savoy's principal comedian and was principal exponent of the patter roles there until 1903. After His Majesty closed, Lytton remained in the Savoy company – joined the following year by his wife – playing a wide range of other baritone roles, from comic to romantic and serious. His only patter role during this period was Major General Stanley in a revival of The Pirates of Penzance (1900), in which Passmore took the part of the Sergeant of Police.

Between 1897 and 1903 Lytton's Gilbert and Sullivan roles at the Savoy were Wilfred Shadbolt in The Yeomen of the Guard, Giuseppe in The Gondoliers, the Learned Judge in Trial by Jury, Dr Daly in The Sorcerer, Captain Corcoran in H.M.S. Pinafore, Grosvenor in Patience, and Strephon in Iolanthe. In operas not by Gilbert and Sullivan he created nine roles: Prince Paul in The Grand Duchess of Gerolstein (1897), Simon Limal in The Beauty Stone (1898), Baron Tabasco in The Lucky Star (1899), Sultan Mahmoud in The Rose of Persia (1899), Charlie Brown in the curtain raiser Pretty Polly (1899), Ib's Father in Ib and Little Christina (1901), Pat Murphy in The Emerald Isle (1901), the Earl of Essex in Merrie England (1902), and William Jelf in A Princess of Kensington (1903).

While appearing at the Savoy, Lytton made a brief and unsuccessful attempt at theatrical production. He and some partners leased the Criterion Theatre to stage The Wild Rabbit, a farce by George Arliss, which had done well in a provincial tour. The reviews were reasonably favourable, but the production opened during a heat wave in the summer of 1899 and played for only three weeks, sustaining over £1,000 in losses (equivalent to £111,100 in 2025). A second investment later in the year, in Melnotte, an operatic version of the comedy The Lady of Lyons, also lost money, after which Lytton abandoned thoughts of being an impresario.

=== West End: 1903 to 1909 ===
After the run of A Princess of Kensington ended in May 1903 the company toured the piece and then dispersed. After 1903 a single D'Oyly Carte touring company continued to appear in the provinces. The Savoy closed, reopening the following year under a different management.

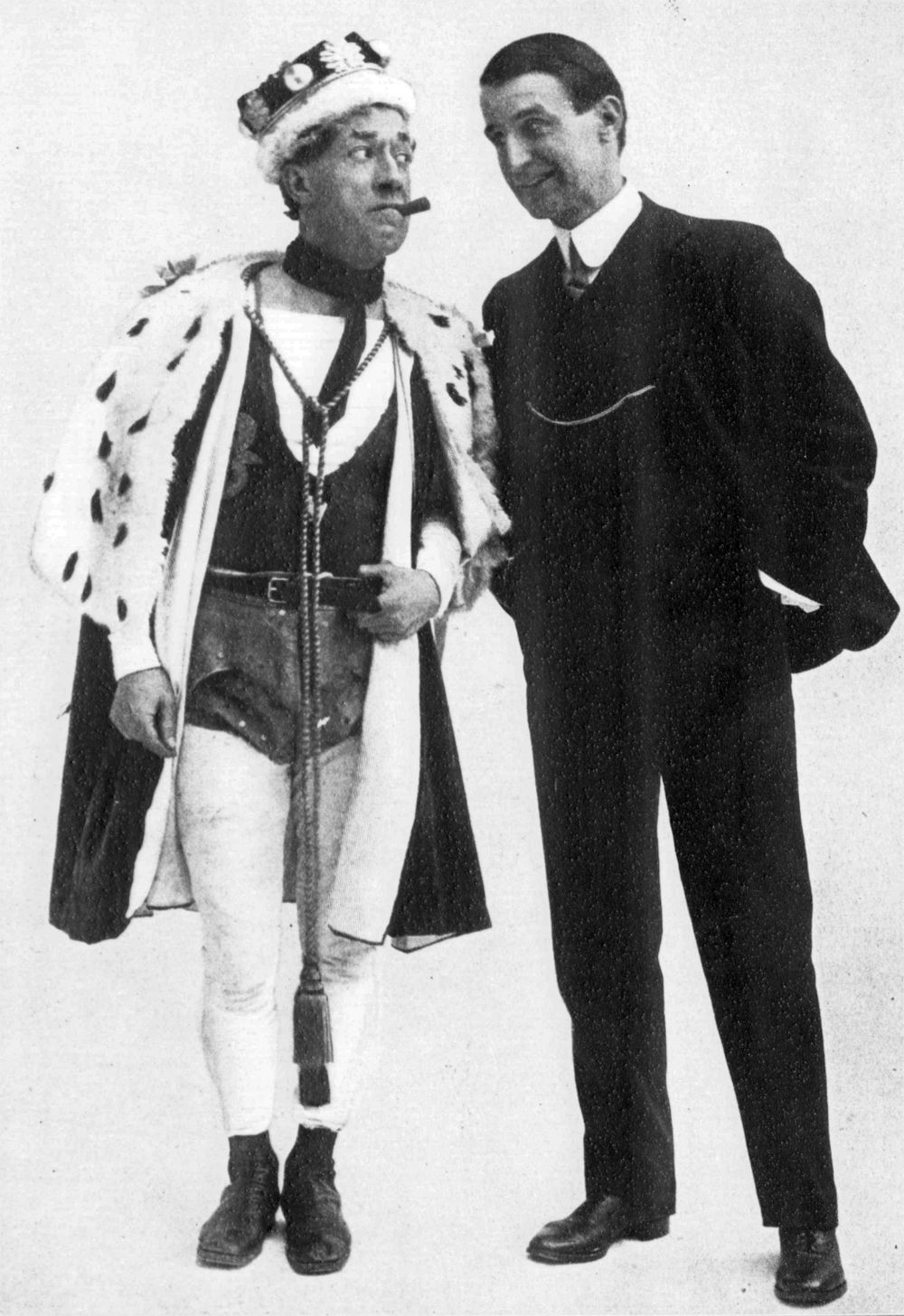
Lytton, r, with Walter Passmore in The Earl and the Girl (1903)

Many of the former Savoy company, including Isabel Jay, Robert Evett, Barrington, Passmore and Lytton continued to appear in the West End in musical comedies, many of which had long runs. Between 1903 and 1907 Lytton appeared in West End productions by William Greet, George Edwardes, Seymour Hicks and Frank Curzon, starring in The Earl and the Girl and as the Real Soldier in Little Hans Andersen (both 1903, alongside Passmore); as Reggie in The Talk of the Town (1905, also with Passmore); Aristide in The Little Michus (1905, with Evett); Reginald in The White Chrysanthemum (1905, with Barrington and Jay); Boniface in The Spring Chicken (1905); and Jack in My Darling (1907).

Apart from his musical comedy roles, Lytton wrote for and performed in the music halls. In 1904 he wrote the libretto for a one-act operetta, The Knights of the Road, set to music by Sir Alexander MacKenzie, which was well received at its premiere at the Palace Theatre of Varieties in February 1905. The Musical Standard commented favourably on the piece and its "unmistakably Savoy flavour". Lytton performed in music hall sketches with Connie Ediss in 1906 and Constance Hyem in 1908.

Lytton wrote that greatly as he enjoyed, and profited from, his musical comedy roles, he found them shallow and superficial compared with the Savoy Operas, to which he was glad to return in 1907. He appeared at the Savoy in Helen Carte's first London repertory season of Gilbert and Sullivan in June of that year, playing Strephon. When she presented a second London repertory season, from April 1908 to March 1909, he played in all five operas staged, as the Mikado; Dick Deadeye in H.M.S. Pinafore; Strephon; the Pirate King in The Pirates of Penzance; and Giuseppe in The Gondoliers. The patter roles were played by C. H. Workman, seconded from the year-round touring company. (Note: When Workman was away in August 1908, Lytton switched temporarily to take over the roles of Ko-Ko and Sir Joseph, his own roles being covered by Leicester Tunks.) At the end of the season Workman left to pursue a career as an actor-manager; (Note: Later that year, a quarrel over Workman's production of Gilbert's Fallen Fairies ended with Gilbert banning Workman from appearing in any of his works on stage in the United Kingdom.) Lytton took over the patter roles in the touring company, in which his fellow principals included Fred Billington, Clara Dow, Sydney Granville, Louie René and Leicester Tunks.

=== Principal comedian: 1909 to 1934 ===
Helen Carte died in 1913, and the opera company was inherited by her stepson Rupert D'Oyly Carte. Although he wrote in 1922 that "the scope and versatility" of Lytton's work was unique, three years earlier, when planning the company's first London season after more than ten years exclusively on tour, Carte had hoped to persuade Workman, who was in Australia, to return. Workman declined, and Lytton remained in possession of the patter roles both in London and on tour for the rest of his career. After the opening night of the 1919–20 London season at the Prince's Theatre, in which he played the Duke of Plaza-Toro, The Observer commented:

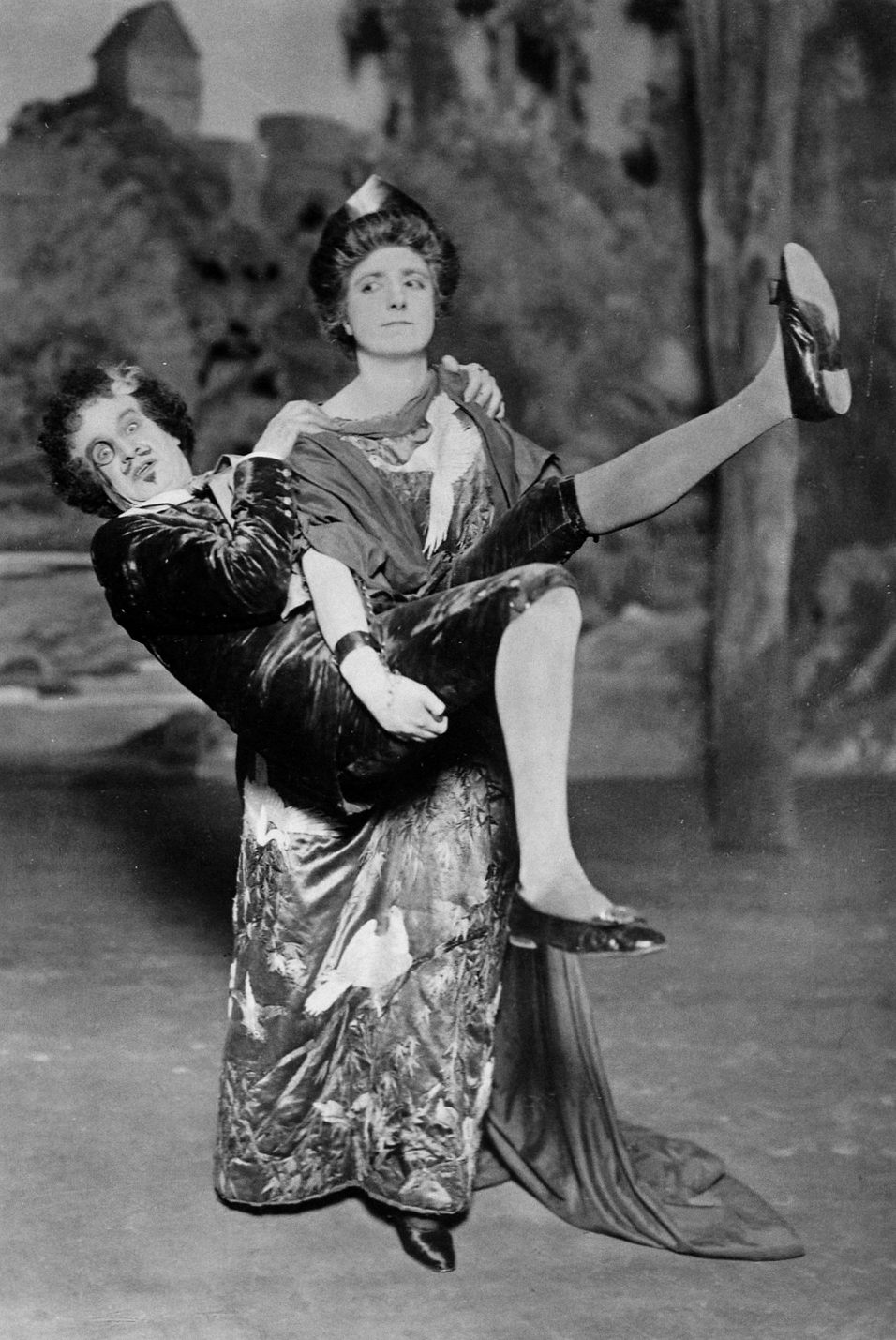
With Bertha Lewis in Patience, 1922

When Mr Henry Lytton, who will obviously be the mainstay of the season, descended from his gondola the audience really let itself go, and even an experienced player like Mr Lytton might have been excused had the ovation put him off his stride. But, happily, Mr Lytton was in great form, and he soon had his audience in transports of joy.

By this point in his tenure as principal comedian, Lytton was the public face of the company; he "exuded warmth and geniality" when representing it before audiences, interviewers and the public. He starred in later seasons at the Prince's (1921, 1924 and 1926), in tours of Canada in 1927 and 1928 and the US in 1929, and in London seasons at the Savoy in 1929–30 and 1932–33.

Carte attempted to balance respect for tradition with the desire to keep productions fresh. Lytton approved of the new costumes commissioned by Carte, but strongly disapproved of, and battled against, the brisk tempi imposed by Malcolm Sargent, the young conductor brought in as musical director for the London seasons of 1926 and 1929–30. Lytton, who never mastered the skill of reading music, had learnt his parts by rote, and had trouble with what he called "the twiddly bits" − Sullivan's turns and ornaments; The Times commented in 1926 that he "shows more respect for Gilbert's words than for Sullivan's notes, though he still manages to give the gist even of the latter". Sargent studied Sullivan's manuscripts, and for some numbers set tempi that Lytton found difficult to cope with. There were rows at rehearsal and sometimes open disagreement in performances, with Lytton deliberately lagging behind Sargent's beat.

Lytton was knighted in the 1930 Birthday Honours; he is the only person to have received the accolade for achievements as a Gilbert and Sullivan performer. The award was marked by newspapers in Australia, Britain, Canada, New Zealand and the US. In May the following year Lytton, driving in heavy rain, crashed his car; his passenger, his fellow D'Oyly Carte principal Bertha Lewis, was killed, and he was injured. He was absent for six weeks, during which Martyn Green, his understudy and eventual successor, took over his roles. In August 1931 Lytton permanently handed over two of his roles to Green – Robin Oakapple and the Major General.

Lytton's last central London appearance was as Ko-Ko at the Savoy in January 1933. He then toured with the D'Oyly Carte company until 30 June 1934, making his final appearance at the Gaiety Theatre, Dublin as Jack Point. He was the last remaining member of the company to have performed under the direction of both Gilbert and Sullivan. In his memoirs he listed thirty different roles in Gilbert and Sullivan operas he had played during his career. (Note: Lytton listed his Gilbert and Sullivan roles as Counsel, Usher and the Learned Judge in Trial by Jury, Hercules, Sir Marmaduke, Dr Daly and John Wellington Wells in The Sorcerer; Captain Corcoran, Dick Deadeye and Sir Joseph Porter in H.M.S. Pinafore; Samuel, the Pirate King and Major-General Stanley in Pirates; Bunthorne and Grosvenor in Patience; Strephon, Lord Mountararat and the Lord Chancellor in Iolanthe; Florian and King Gama in Princess Ida; Ko-Ko and the Mikado in The Mikado; Robin in Ruddigore; the Lieutenant, Jack Point and Wilfred Shadbolt in The Yeomen of the Guard; Giuseppe and the Duke of Plaza-Toro in The Gondoliers; King Paramount in Utopia Limited; and Ludwig in The Grand Duke. Jones adds the Foreman in Trial by Jury, but notes that no records have been found of Lytton's appearing as Mountararat or the Lieutenant.)

Lytton in six of his roles

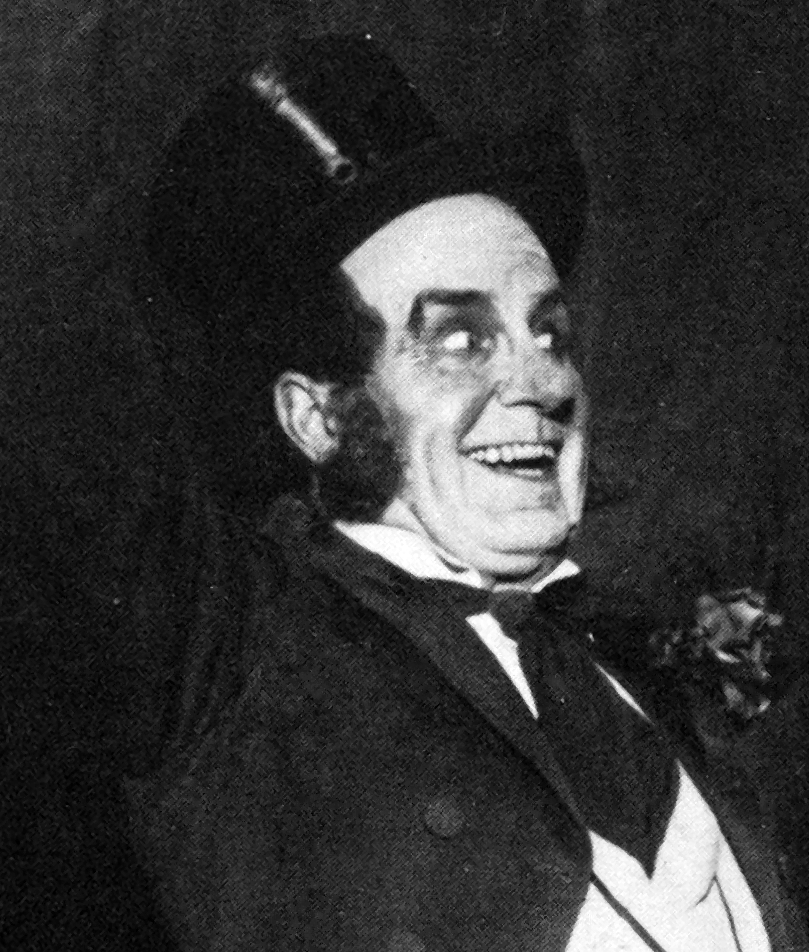
John Wellington Wells

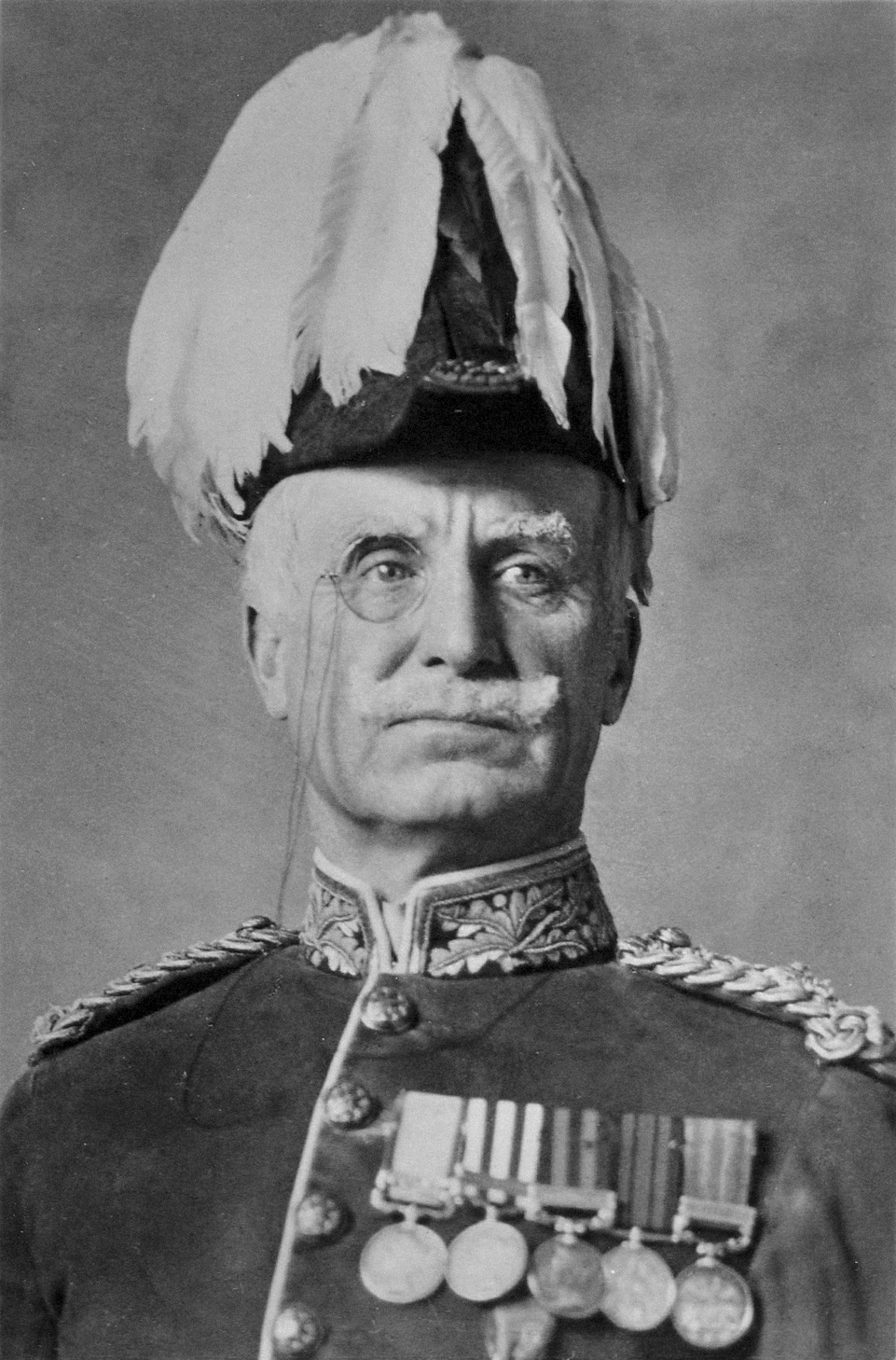
Major-General Stanley

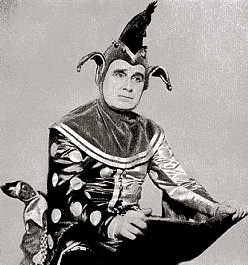
Jack Point

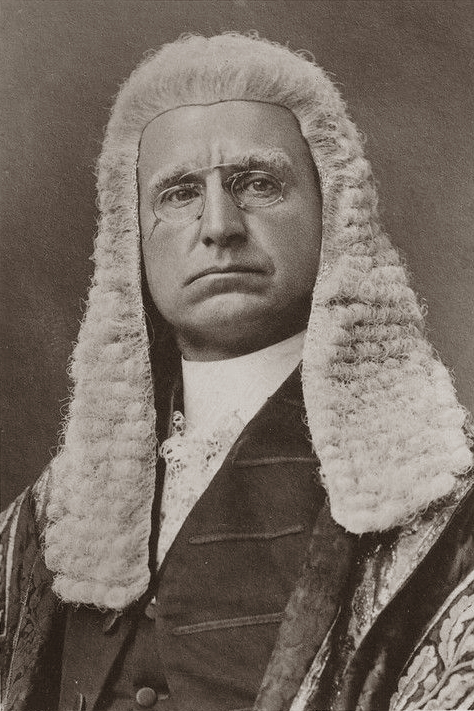
The Lord Chancellor

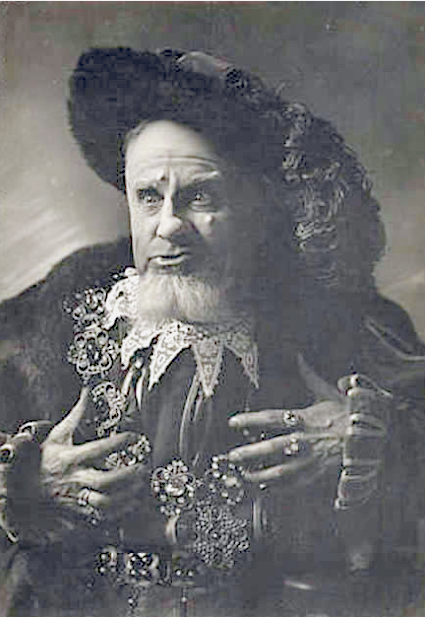
King Gama

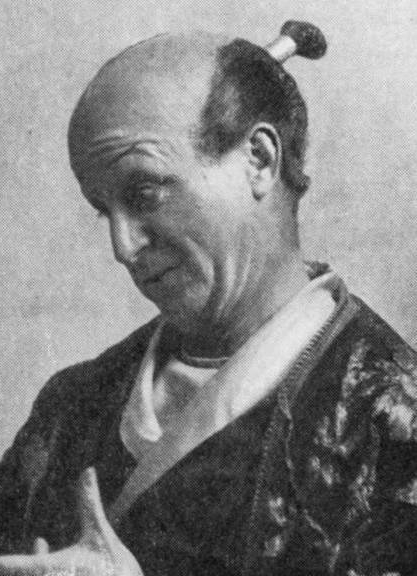
Ko-Ko

=== Last years ===
After retiring from the D'Oyly Carte company Lytton made his last stage appearance, as the Emperor of China in Aladdin, the Christmas pantomime at the Prince of Wales Theatre, Birmingham in 1934–35. It was also his last broadcast performance, being relayed by the BBC on New Year's Day, 1935.

Lytton died at his home in Earls Court, London, in 1936 at the age of 71; he was survived by his wife, Louie Henri, who died in 1947, their two sons, including Henry Lytton, Jr. (1906–1965), whose high-profile marriage to Jessie Matthews in 1926 ended in divorce in 1929, and two daughters, Bessie Ena Lytton Elverston (1904–1995) and Ida Louise Lytton-Gay (1883–1979). Another son, Percy Arthur Bertram Lytton (1893–1918), was killed in February 1918 while serving in the Royal Flying Corps, and two others died in infancy.

In an appreciation in The Manchester Guardian, the critic Neville Cardus wrote:

Old men with long memories have been known to maintain that Lytton was not as great a comic actor in the Savoy operas as Grossmith was, or George Thorne. The truth is that Lytton could never be estimated purely and simply as an actor. There was indeed a touch about him of the inspired amateur; that is to say, he usually seemed able to win his audience without help of the tricks of the footlights. On or off the stage he was the least theatrical of men; his art was indeed nothing but his nature. ... He cannot be replaced; he has left no successor. His public was conquered by a winning geniality which was his mortal self.

== Recordings, film and broadcasts ==
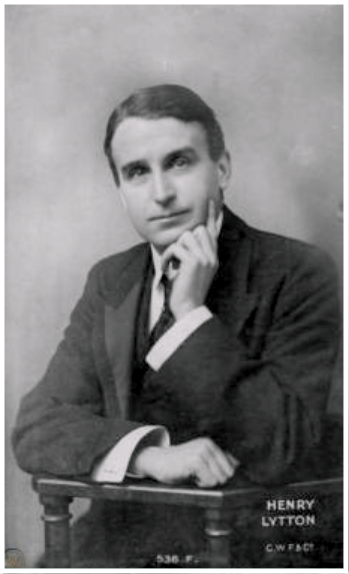
Lytton c. 1900

Lytton featured prominently in early gramophone recordings. As early as 1902–03 the Gramophone Company (HMV) was promoting him as one of its stars along with performers ranging from Enrico Caruso, Edvard Grieg and Joseph Joachim to Dan Leno, Marie Lloyd and George Robey. His recordings between 1901 and 1905 include "My Cosy Corner Girl" from The Earl and the Girl, which was something of a best-seller. Twenty-five of his recordings were collected on the 1982 LP set "The Art of Henry Lytton". It contains eight Gilbert and Sullivan numbers from five operas, and songs from three other shows in which he appeared – Merrie England, A Princess of Kensington and The Earl and the Girl – and three he did not appear in – A Country Girl, The Toreador and The Girl from Kay's. The set also contains four non-show songs, including one of his own composition. (Note: The Gilbert and Sullivan tracks are: "Time was when love and I were well acquainted" (The Sorcerer); "None shall part us" (Iolanthe, with Louie Henri); "If you give me your attention" and "Whene'er I spoke sarcastic joke" (Princess Ida); "As some day it may happen" and "On a tree by a river" (The Mikado); "In enterprise of martial kind" (The Gondoliers); and "When I was a lad" (H.M.S. Pinafore). The other tracks are "Imagination" and "The Yeomen of England" (Merrie England); "Four jolly sailormen" (A Princess of Kensington) "Two little chicks", "Me and Mrs Brown", "Quarrelling" and "Peace, peace" (A Country Girl); "Everybody's awfully good to me", "When I marry Amelia" and "Archie, Archie" (The Toreador); "By the shore of the Mediterranean" and "My cosy corner girl" (The Earl and the Girl); "Make it up" (The Girl from Kay's) and four stand-alone songs: "He was a sailor" (anon), "The dotlet of my eye" (music by Johann Strauss II), "You'd better ask me" (by Hermann Lohr) and Lytton's own "The laughing song".)

George Baker, who sang several of Lytton's roles in HMV recordings in the 1920s and 1930s, later described Lytton's voice as "light, tenory, thinnish", but added that in the theatre "he persuaded me that he was a good baritone – he wasn't, really, but he was such a supreme actor … that he could persuade you he could sing splendidly". By the time HMV began using D'Oyly Carte principals in its recordings of the Savoy operas in the mid-1920s, Lytton's voice was not thought suitable for the gramophone, and he was included in only Princess Ida in 1924 (acoustic) and 1932 (electrical), The Mikado in 1926, The Gondoliers in 1927, and H.M.S. Pinafore in 1930, his other roles being sung by Baker. When the 1930 H.M.S. Pinafore was released, Cardus wrote in The Manchester Guardian, "It was high time something was done to send down to posterity the genius of the greatest of all surviving artists in Gilbert and Sullivan. The omission of Lytton's voice from the [1930] Iolanthe was a blunder of the first importance … there is no mistaking the Lytton accent, the old kindly yet pungent tones".

Lytton sang Ko-Ko in a 1926 BBC radio broadcast of two half-hour excerpts from The Mikado, and appeared in the same role in a four-minute-long silent promotional film for the D'Oyly Carte production in the same year. In January 1933 the BBC broadcast the last night of the D'Oyly Carte London season, which marked Lytton's last appearance in the West End. He sang Ko-Ko in Act 1 of The Mikado. On Christmas Day of the same year, while the company was playing in the London suburb Golders Green, Lytton – described by the BBC as the "G&S star of stars" – performed in a broadcast of Act 2 of The Mikado from a radio studio in London, with Isidore Godfrey conducting a BBC orchestra and the D'Oyly Carte cast.

== Notes, references and sources ==
=== Sources ===
- Ainger, Michael (2002). Gilbert and Sullivan: A Dual Biography. Oxford: Oxford University Press. ISBN 978-0-19-514769-8.
- Gordon, J. M. (2014). The Memoirs of J M Gordon 1856–1944: Stage Director D'Oyly Carte Opera Company. Elizabeth Benney (ed). Tunbridge Wells: Richard Pitcairn-Knowles. ISBN 978-0-9558591-4-4.
- Jones, Brian (2005). Lytton, Gilbert and Sullivan's Jester. London: Trafford. ISBN 978-1-4120-5482-9.
- Joseph, Tony (1994). The D'Oyly Carte Opera Company, 1875–1982: An Unofficial History. London: Bunthorne Books. ISBN 978-0-9507992-1-6.
- Joseph, Tony (2003). Aileen Davies: 1920s Soubrette. Bristol: Bunthorne Books. ISBN 0950-7992-5-4.
- Lytton, Henry (1922). The Secrets of a Savoyard. London: Jarrolds. ISBN 978-81-237-4314-1. OCLC 1073391942.
- Lytton, Henry (1933). A Wandering Minstrel. London: Jarrolds. OCLC 966803464.
- Parker, John; Freda Gale; Ian Herbert (1978). Who Was Who in the Theatre, 1912–1976. Detroit: Gale. ISBN 978-0-8103-0406-2.
- Reid, Charles (1968). Malcolm Sargent: A Biography. London: Hamish Hamilton. ISBN 978-0-241-91316-1.
- Rollins, Cyril; R. John Witts (1962). The D'Oyly Carte Opera Company in Gilbert and Sullivan Operas: A Record of Productions, 1875–1961. London: Michael Joseph. OCLC 504581419.
- Stedman, Jane W. (1996). W. S. Gilbert, A Classic Victorian & His Theatre. Oxford University Press. ISBN 978-0-19-816174-5.
- Wearing, J. P. (1981). The London Stage, 1900–1909: A Calendar of Plays and Players. Metuchen, N.J: Scarecrow. ISBN 978-0-8108-1403-5.
