= Trood =

Trood is a surname. Notable people with the surname include:

- Russell Trood (1948–2017), Australian politician
- Thomas Trood (1833–1916), British entrepreneur and politician
- Vic Trood (1891–1977), Australian footballer
- W. H. Trood (1859–1899), English artist
