= Louie Henri =

English singer and actress (1864–1947)

Louie Henri, Lady Lytton (12 April 1864 – 2 May 1947) was an English singer and actress, best known for her many roles in the Savoy Operas with the D'Oyly Carte Opera Company. She married Henry Lytton, who eventually became the company's longstanding principal comedian.

Henri's career got off to an early start when she joined Florence St. John's Opera Company at the age of 15, but she left that troupe to help start her husband's acting career. Together, they struggled to establish more secure careers in the theatre and eventually obtained steady employment in D'Oyly Carte touring companies. Henri was promoted to play the leading mezzo-soprano roles in the Gilbert and Sullivan operas and the other productions of the company for about a decade. However, in 1898, after her husband became a principal player in the main company at the Savoy Theatre, Henri retired from the stage at the age of 34.

== Life and career ==
Henri was born Louisa Webber in Paddington, London, the daughter of William Webber, a cheese seller, and Eliza née Saville. Henri probably met her future husband, Henry Lytton, at St. Philip's Church, where he sang as a boy and she may also have sung.

=== Early career ===
Henri first appeared on stage in 1879 at the age of 15 with Florence St. John's Opera Company, performing in Jacques Offenbach's Madame Favart at the Strand Theatre and Edmond Audran's Olivette at the Avenue Theatre, both in 1880, in the latter of which she played a small role. She appeared in other operettas with St. John but left in 1881 to help Lytton begin his acting career. They joined the company at the Philharmonic Theatre, Islington in several plays, including The Obstinate Bretons and The Shaughraun by Dion Boucicault, and then, with Kate Santley, played at the Royalty Theatre. There they appeared in Ixion, or the Man at the Wheel by F. C. Burnand, but the theatre closed soon afterwards. Henri rejoined St. John's company, playing in Bucalossi's Les Manteaux Noirs at the Avenue Theatre in 1882. She then rejoined Santley's company at the Royalty in 1883 in The Merry Duchess, but Lytton was out of acting work all this time and was forced to take a variety of odd jobs. Henri then played in the lavish 1883 Christmas pantomime of Cinderella at the Theatre Royal, Drury Lane. Henri and Lytton married in early 1884, both aged 19, at St. Mary Abbot's Church, Kensington. Neither family attended the ceremony.

Henri left the Drury Lane to join the D'Oyly Carte Opera Company to play the small role of Ada in the first provincial tour of Gilbert and Sullivan's Princess Ida, beginning in February 1884, in which Courtice Pounds played Hilarion and Fred Billington played Hildebrand. She obtained an audition for Lytton, claiming that he was her brother, and he was also engaged in the chorus and small parts, and immediately as the understudy for the role of King Gama in Princess Ida. The Ida tour continued for almost a year, and then the couple toured in additional D'Oyly Carte productions, interspersed with other engagements until May 1885. Also, in January 1885, Henri gave birth to the couple's first child, Ida Louise Jones, taking off only a few weeks before returning to the stage.

In the summer of 1885, she and Lytton joined with other out-of-work actors and travelled from town to town in Surrey for three months, performing a drama called All of Her, a comedy entitled Masters and Servants, and an operetta, Tom Tug the Waterman. The plays were augmented by songs and dances. The income provided by this work was not adequate, and the struggling young actors experienced hunger. In the autumn of 1885, Henri and Lytton joined a D'Oyly Carte tour, playing in Trial by Jury (with Henri as the First Bridesmaid), The Sorcerer, Patience and The Pirates of Penzance. The two then played in the Christmas pantomime of Cinderella at the Theatre Royal, Manchester.

In 1886, they joined the chorus of Erminie, starring Florence St. John, and The Lily of Leoville by Ivan Caryll and Clement Scott, at the Comedy Theatre, and then toured in Erminie into the autumn of that year. Whenever out of work, Lytton took more odd jobs, putting his artist training to use part of the time by painting decorative plaques. At the end of the year, Lytton was engaged in the chorus of The Mikado, which was nearing the end of its original run at the Savoy Theatre. Not only did Henri help Lytton get started in the theatre world and nurture his career, but Lytton was nearly musically illiterate, and Henri played the piano for him to prepare him for his roles, as well as coaching him in acting.

Lytton became understudy to George Grossmith at the Savoy Theatre in January 1887 for the original production of Ruddigore, and when Grossmith fell ill, he had a chance to play the central character, Robin Oakapple. This led to an engagement for Lytton to play the principal comedian roles with D'Oyly Carte touring companies, beginning in 1887. In 1888, Henri joined him on tour, when she first played Edith in The Pirates of Penzance, Pitti-Sing in The Mikado, and substituted in April as Josephine in H.M.S. Pinafore. By November 1888, however, Louie went on maternity leave.

=== Principal soubrette and later years ===
In early 1889, Henri returned to the tour as Phoebe in The Yeomen of the Guard and also played Pitti-Sing. She left the company to have another baby in March 1890, returning in November to play Pitti-Sing. In 1891, Henri shared the roles of Pitti-Sing and Tessa in The Gondoliers and then added the title role in Iolanthe to her repertoire. In 1892–93, she had another child and then toured as Iolanthe, Pitti-Sing and Tessa, as well as Nelly Bly in The Vicar of Bray, Arabella Lane in Billee Taylor and Dorcas in Haddon Hall. In 1894–95, she played Princess Nekaya in Utopia, Limited, Nelly Bly, Zerbinetta in Mirette, Dolly Grigg in The Chieftain, and Melissa in Princess Ida.

In 1896–97, Henri toured as Julia Jellicoe in The Grand Duke (together with Lytton as Ludwig), as well as Nekaya; Constance in The Sorcerer; Cousin Hebe in Pinafore; Edith; Lady Angela in Patience; Iolanthe; Melissa; Pitti-Sing; Phoebe; and Tessa. In June 1897, she was called to the Savoy Theatre, joining Lytton there, where she was a chorister in the revival of Yeomen and the new production of The Grand Duchess of Gerolstein, while creating the title role in Old Sarah, the companion piece to both works. In March 1898, she played Tessa at the Savoy in the first revival of The Gondoliers.

Henri left D'Oyly Carte and retired from the stage in May 1898, although she later appeared in a few silent films. Lytton claimed, in his 1922 memoir, The Secrets of a Savoyard, that she also appeared at some point in her career as the Plaintiff in Trial by Jury and Mrs. Partlett in The Sorcerer, which he says was "probably... a greater number of parts... than any other lady connected with the company." Lytton died in 1936, and Henri survived him by eleven years.

Henri died in Surbiton, Surrey, at the age of 83, survived by her son Henry Lytton, Jr., whose high profile marriage to Jessie Matthews in 1925 ended in divorce in 1930. The couple also had two other sons, one of whom was a pilot killed in World War I, and a daughter, Ena Elverston. They also had two other children who died in infancy.

== Recordings and films ==
In 1902–03 Henri recorded several songs, mostly from Edwardian musical comedies, including A Country Girl and The Girl from Kays, and mostly duets with her husband. They also recorded a duet from Iolanthe, "None shall part us", although she had never appeared as Phyllis.

Years later, Henri appeared in several silent films, perhaps the best known of which was the 1913 film Sixty Years a Queen, in which she played Queen Victoria.
