= Henry Lytton Jr. =

British actor and singer (1906–1965)

Henry Lytton Jr. (2 July 1906 – 16 September 1965) was an English actor and singer who appeared in musical comedy and a few screen roles, and later as a pantomime dame and ringmaster of the Blackpool Tower Circus.

== Early life and career ==
Lytton was born Lord Alver Lytton in Chiswick in 1906, the youngest child of Gilbert and Sullivan performers Henry Lytton and Louie Henri. He was disinherited from his father's will because Lytton Sr. disapproved of his son's marriage to Jessie Matthews and his following a career in the theatre. However, on her death in 1947 he found himself in his mother's will.

He appeared in The Charlot Show of 1925, and the following year as Reggie opposite the singer and dancer Jessie Matthews in The Charlot Show of 1926 at the Prince of Wales Theatre in London. Following a whirlwind romance the two married in Hammersmith in London on 17 February 1926, aged 19 and 18 respectively. They divorced in November 1929 owing to Lytton's numerous infidelities. Lytton played Lord Campton in the musical Virginia (1929) at the Palace Theatre in London and later on tour. In 1931 he was touring in the musical Here Comes the Bride opposite Pola Negri. He married the actress Barbara Joan Weale (1906–2000) in Kensington in London in 1931, and by 1939 the couple were living in Sunbury-on-Thames.

== Later years ==
Lytton appeared in the pantomime Goody Two Shoes at the Grand Theatre in Leeds (1938); in High Time (1946–1947), and in Here There and Everywhere (1947–1948) alongside Tommy Trinder, both at the London Palladium. His film appearances included the short After Dinner (1938), in which his wife Barbara Lytton also appeared, and George in Laugh It Off (1940), both with Trinder, while his television appearances included four episodes of The Charlie Chester Show (1951).

From 1954 to his death, Lytton lived in Blackpool, Lancashire, having moved there to take over as ringmaster each summer at the Blackpool Tower Circus, a position he held until his death. During the Christmas period Lytton appeared as a pantomime dame, on one occasion in Goody Two Shoes at the Empire Theatre in Leeds. Other pantomime appearances included Dame Horner in Jack and Jill in 1948–1949 at the Manchester Hippodrome, repeating the role in 1951–1952, followed by Queen Hysteria in Little Miss Muffet in 1952–1953 and 1958–1959, all at the New Palace Theatre of Varieties in Plymouth.

Lytton died of a heart attack in Blackpool in 1965, aged 59. In his will he left £1,205 to his widow Barbara Joan Lytton.
