= Leicester Tunks =

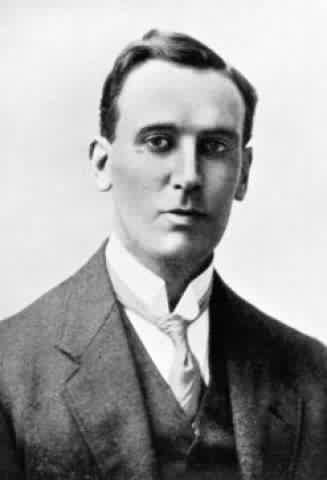
Leicester Tunks in 1914

Leicester Tunks (1880 – 4 July 1935) was an English opera singer remembered as a principal baritone with the D'Oyly Carte Opera Company from 1904 to 1916. He served in World War I and later ran a poultry farm.

== Early life ==
Born in Walthamstow in Essex in 1880 the son of Emma Charleson née Arney and Charles George Tunks, his father was a member of the London Stock Exchange.

== D'Oyly Carte ==
Tunks joined the D'Oyly Carte Opera Company on tour in December 1904 playing Captain Corcoran in H.M.S. Pinafore. From January 1905 to June 1907 in addition to Corcoran he played baritone roles in the company's Gilbert and Sullivan repertory, including Samuel in The Pirates of Penzance, Colonel Calverley in Patience, Mountararat in Iolanthe, Florian in Princess Ida, Pish-Tush in The Mikado, the Lieutenant of the Tower in The Yeomen of the Guard, and Luiz in The Gondoliers. From July 1907 Tunks was promoted to the Pirate King in Pirates, the title role in The Mikado and Giuseppe in The Gondoliers.

For D'Oyly Carte's Second London Repertory season at the Savoy Theatre from April to October 1908 Tunks played Pish-Tush in The Mikado and Bill Bobstay in H.M.S. Pinafore, while in August 1908 he briefly appeared as the Mikado during the temporary absence of Henry Lytton. On 15 October 1908 he married Ethel Rose New Child (1880–1937) in London. Their daughter was Phyllis Ethel Tunks (1910–2005).

On his return to touring in October 1908 Tunks' roles were Captain Corcoran in Pinafore, the Pirate King in Pirates, Archibald Grosvenor in Patience, Mountararat in Iolanthe, Florian in Ida, the title role in The Mikado, Sergeant Meryll in Yeomen, and Giuseppe in Gondoliers. While touring in Scotland in about 1909 Tunks and the Company were snowed in for 12 hours between Dundee and Aberdeen. With the blizzard raging outside the train no one had thought to bring refreshments as ordinarily the journey was a short one. Coincidentally, it was Tunks' birthday, and he having little faith in the eatables provided by theatrical landladies had obtained a large steak and kidney pie with various other confections plus a few bottles of spirits and beer to share with his friends in the digs. Instead, these were shared among all those present who merrily toasted Tunks for saving them all from starvation.

From March 1914 to November 1915 Tunks was temporarily switched to the role of Strephon in Iolanthe. Being tall he was able to wear Mountararat's Garter robes to great effect, while his Pirate King's gesture to Major-General Stanley on the line "We look over it" did just that. His Grosvenor in Patience did not speak with the traditional Cockney accent in his final scenes but instead used a more animated tone than that he used earlier for the idyllic poet and his Captain Corcoran in Pinafore actually serenaded the moon instead of the audience. His Mikado's laugh was more bloodcurdling but briefer than that adopted by some later portrayers of the role.

== Later years ==
In December 1916 Tunks left the D'Oyly Carte to join the Army during World War I, ending the War as a 2nd Lieutenant. After the cessation of hostilities in 1918 Tunks ran a poultry farm in Shanklin on the Isle of Wight.

In his later years Tunks lived in Birmingham in Warwickshire, and here he died in July 1935 aged 54. In his will he left £402 6s 7d to his widow, Ethel Rose New Tunks.
