= Clara Dow =

British opera singer and actress (1883–1969)

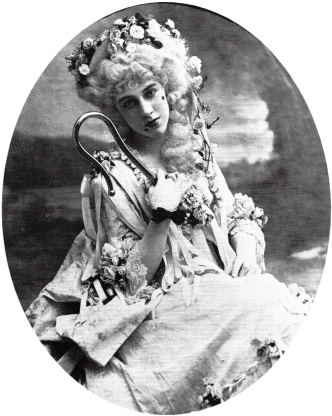
Clara Dow as Phyllis in Iolanthe c. 1908

Clara Millington Dow (29 December 1883 – 26 March 1969) was an English operatic soprano and actress of the early twentieth century. After a concert career, she appeared at the Savoy Theatre in the first repertory seasons of Gilbert and Sullivan operas mounted by the D'Oyly Carte Opera Company in 1906–09, under the direction of the author. She is remembered as one of the last principal sopranos personally trained by W. S. Gilbert at the Savoy. In between engagements with D'Oyly Carte, Dow performed in concerts and operetta. After her retirement from the professional stage, she directed amateur productions of the Savoy Operas until she was in her seventies.

== Early life and career ==
Dow was born in King's Lynn, Norfolk. She made her stage debut at the age of 16 in Hunstanton, and went on to study at the Royal College of Music, where she made her London stage debut in 1900 as the Dewman in a student production of the opera Hansel and Gretel, conducted by Charles Villiers Stanford and directed by Richard Temple. Dow became a professional oratorio and concert singer, appearing, for example, in a promenade concert at the Crystal Palace in 1905. She joined the chorus of the D'Oyly Carte Opera Company for its first London repertory season in December 1906. Dow was soon promoted to small roles, playing Giulia in The Gondoliers and Kate in The Yeomen of the Guard in January 1907, also understudying and occasionally appearing in some of the leading roles.

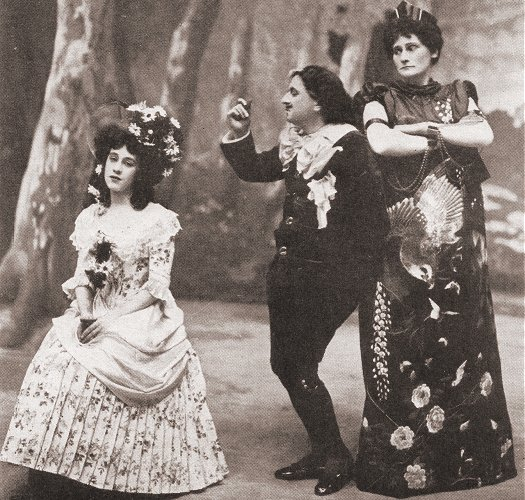
Dow (left) with C. H. Workman and Louie René in Patience, 1907

In April 1907, she was promoted to the title role in Patience, and by June 1907 she was also playing the leading soprano parts of Phyllis in Iolanthe and Elsie in Yeomen. Dow also played Gianetta in The Gondoliers in the latter part of the 1907 season. Dow later remembered that, while still a chorister, she had an opportunity to sing part of the role of Elsie for W. S. Gilbert at a rehearsal of The Yeomen of the Guard. The singer chosen by Helen Carte came from a grand opera background. "She had a beautiful voice, but poor diction, and Gilbert mumbled, 'I did not sit up all night for my words to be distorted by this d....d Italian method', with the result, the lady, at last reduced to tears, ran off the stage. I was immediately called out to continue her solo, and Gilbert said 'It's like coming out of a fog'."

From November 1907 to April 1908, she joined the D'Oyly Carte touring company, playing the soprano leads of Josephine in H.M.S. Pinafore, Mabel in The Pirates of Penzance, Patience, Phyllis, the title role in Princess Ida, Yum-Yum in The Mikado, Elsie, and Gianetta. She returned to the Savoy for the second London repertory season, beginning in April 1908, appearing as Yum-Yum and later as Phyllis.

The Times said that as Yum-Yum she "sang somewhat weakly, but she realized the part well". The Observer found her "A Yum-Yum of undoubted charm". Her Phyllis again divided opinion. The Times said, "If only all Miss Clara Dow's notes were as true and sweet as a few of them are, she might have sung Phyllis as well as she acted it", but The Observer wrote, "Miss Clara Dow as Phyllis was peculiarly satisfactory. The slight whiteness of her voice and what one may call the tartness of manner she is able to command made a real Phyllis of her, dainty, a little petulant, yet winning." She rejoined the repertory touring company in November 1908, remaining with them for a year as principal soprano. The Times thought her "quite captivating" as Patience. As the repertory seasons were the last seasons of Gilbert and Sullivan operas directed by Gilbert, Dow and Elsie Spain, who played soprano roles in the 1908–09 seasons, were the last D'Oyly Carte principal sopranos personally trained by W. S. Gilbert.

At the end of that tour, Dow left the company and married an aviator, Wilfred Foulis. At the time, the press reported that she would in future appear on the concert platform, rather than in opera, but she rejoined D'Oyly Carte in her old roles in July–September 1911. In 1912, Dow played Mimi in Oscar Straus's operetta, The Dancing Viennese at the London Coliseum. From July 1913 to December 1914, she played her final series of engagements with D'Oyly Carte. The Manchester Guardian wrote that she sang Yum-Yum with "a sweet fluty tone and free vocal style".

== Later years ==
After her retirement, she remained fondly remembered by Gilbert and Sullivan fans. Reviewing a 1936 recording of The Mikado, the critic of The Gramophone commented, "Whenever Yum-Yum is mentioned I think of Clara Dow and find it hard to remember those who succeeded her." In retirement, she remained connected with Gilbert and Sullivan, directing amateur productions. Her final production was Ruddigore in 1954.

Dow lived in Ashtead from 1934 and died at Epsom, Surrey, in a nursing home in 1969, aged 85.
