= Louie René =

British opera singer & actress (c.1872–1955)

Louie René

Louie René (c. 1872 - 9 March 1955) was an English opera singer and actress best remembered for her performances with the D'Oyly Carte Opera Company in the Gilbert and Sullivan contralto roles at the turn of the 20th century.

René performed with D'Oyly Carte touring companies from 1894 to 1903, except for one year, playing the principal contralto roles of the Savoy operas. For most of the period between 1906 and 1914, both in London and on tour, she served as the company's principal contralto, playing the roles of Little Buttercup in H.M.S. Pinafore, Ruth in The Pirates of Penzance and Katisha in The Mikado, among others. After this, she pursued a career in Edwardian musical comedy.

== Early life and career ==
Born in St John's Wood in London, René appeared in 1892–93 with a touring company in The Mountebanks by W. S. Gilbert. The Era commented that she "sings and plays Ultrice in admirable style". She joined a D'Oyly Carte Opera Company touring company in March 1894, immediately playing the principal role of Lady Sophy in Utopia, Limited. The Era commented, "Miss Louie René is seen to great advantage as Lady Sophy." In December of that year, she began to play the role of Little Buttercup in H.M.S. Pinafore, on tour, as well as Lady Sophy.

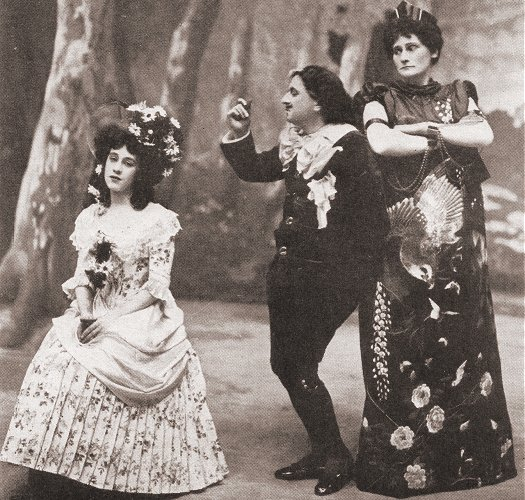
René (r.) as Jane, with Dow and Workman

René continued to tour with D'Oyly Carte until December 1901, playing all the principal Gilbert and Sullivan contralto roles in repertory, as well as the Marquise de Montigny in Mirette (1895), Inez de Roxas in The Chieftain (1895), Lazuli in The Lucky Star (1899), Lady Vernon in Haddon Hall (1899), Dancing Sunbeam in The Rose of Persia (1900–1901), and the Countess of Newtown in The Emerald Isle (1901). Her Savoy opera roles were Sophy, Buttercup, the Lady Jane in Patience, the Duchess of Plaza-Toro in The Gondoliers, Katisha in The Mikado, Baroness von Krakenfeldt in The Grand Duke, Lady Sangazure in The Sorcerer, and Dame Carruthers in The Yeomen of the Guard. An 1896 review said, "The singing of Miss Louie René as Katisha was most enjoyable". During 1902 René did other work but again toured with D'Oyly Carte in 1903, playing Little Buttercup, Katisha, Dame Carruthers and the Duchess of Plaza-Toro. After this, she was absent from the company for three years.

During the company's 1906–07 and 1908–09 London repertory seasons, René returned to the D'Oyly Carte Opera Company to perform at the Savoy Theatre, playing all the lead Gilbert and Sullivan contralto roles, including Dame Carruthers, the Duchess of Plaza Toro, Jane, and the Fairy Queen in Iolanthe, in the first season, and Katisha, Little Buttercup, the Fairy Queen, Ruth in The Pirates of Penzance, the Duchess of Plaza Toro and Dame Carruthers in the second. The Times was not impressed by René, writing: "Miss Louie René makes a better Buttercup than was to be expected from her previous performances." Other reviews also expressed only modified rapture: The Penny Illustrated Paper, said, "As Katisha ... Miss Louie René sings and acts well, though, at times, she seems a trifle lacking in humour." The Observer commented that she performed "adequately, though without any particular distinction."

== Later years ==
René left D'Oyly Carte again for a year, rejoining on tour in March 1910. During this time, she appeared in her old roles, as well as in the part of Lady Blanche in Princess Ida, until December 1914. After this, she left the company for the last time (succeeded in her roles by Bertha Lewis) and pursued a career in Edwardian musical comedy. Among other productions, she appeared in Mark Blow's musical comedies Trouville and Toto, in 1919, and in a revival of A Waltz Dream late in her career.

Her brother-in-law was fellow D'Oyly Carte artiste Scott Russell.

René died in Malvern in 1955, aged about 83.
