= Patience (opera) =

1881 comic opera by Gilbert & Sullivan

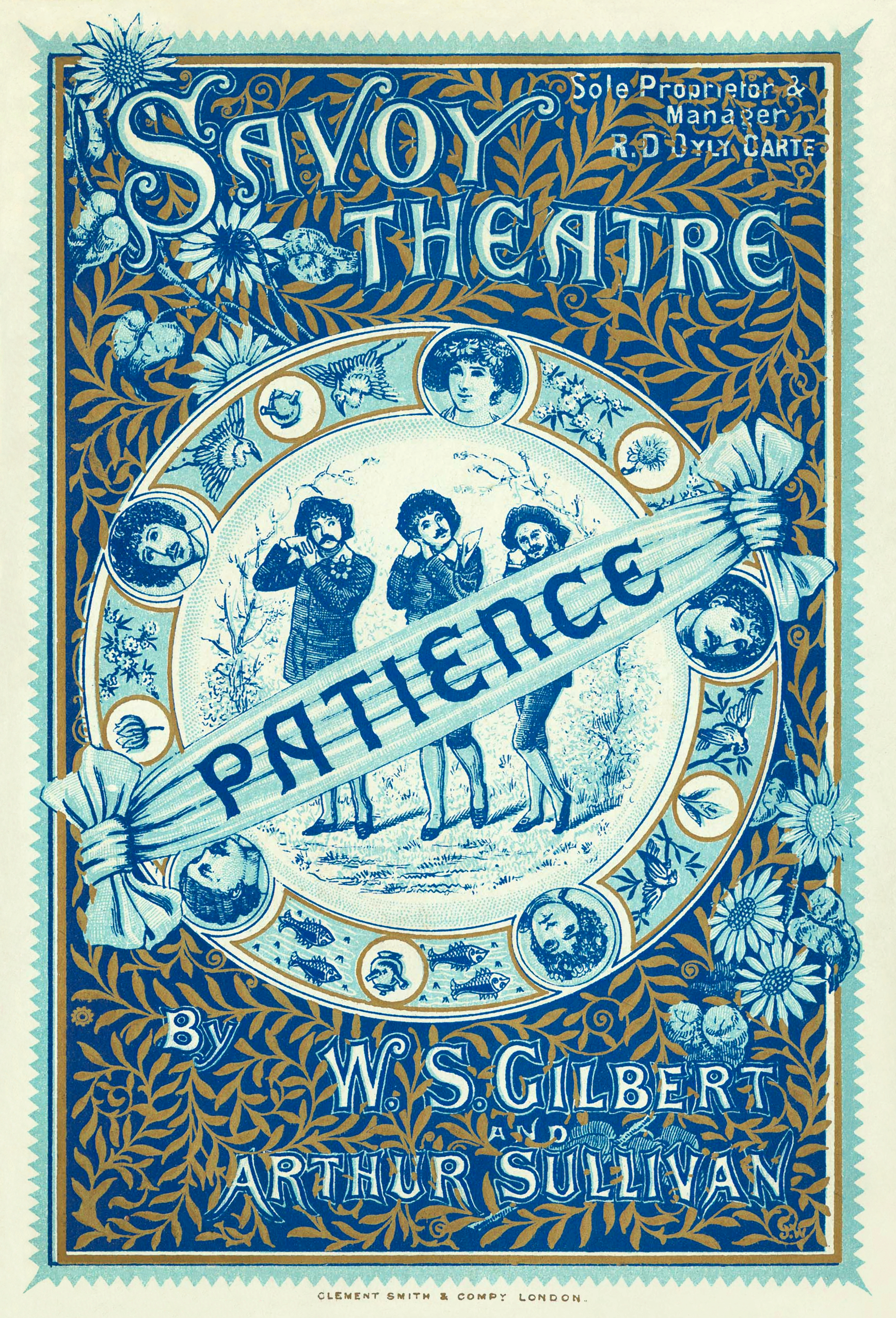
1881 Programme for Patience

Patience; or, Bunthorne's Bride, is a comic opera in two acts with music by Arthur Sullivan and libretto by W. S. Gilbert. The opera is a satire on the aesthetic movement of the 1870s and '80s in England and, more broadly, on fads, superficiality, vanity, hypocrisy and pretentiousness; it also satirises romantic love, rural simplicity and military bluster.

First performed at the Opera Comique, London, on 23 April 1881, Patience moved to the 1,292-seat Savoy Theatre on 10 October 1881, where it was the first theatrical production in the world to be lit entirely by electric light. Henceforth, the Gilbert and Sullivan comic operas would be known as the Savoy Operas, and both fans and performers of Gilbert and Sullivan would come to be known as "Savoyards."

Patience was the sixth operatic collaboration of fourteen between Gilbert and Sullivan. It ran for a total of 578 performances, which was seven more than the authors' earlier work, H.M.S. Pinafore, and the second longest run of any work of musical theatre up to that time, after the operetta Les Cloches de Corneville.

== Background ==
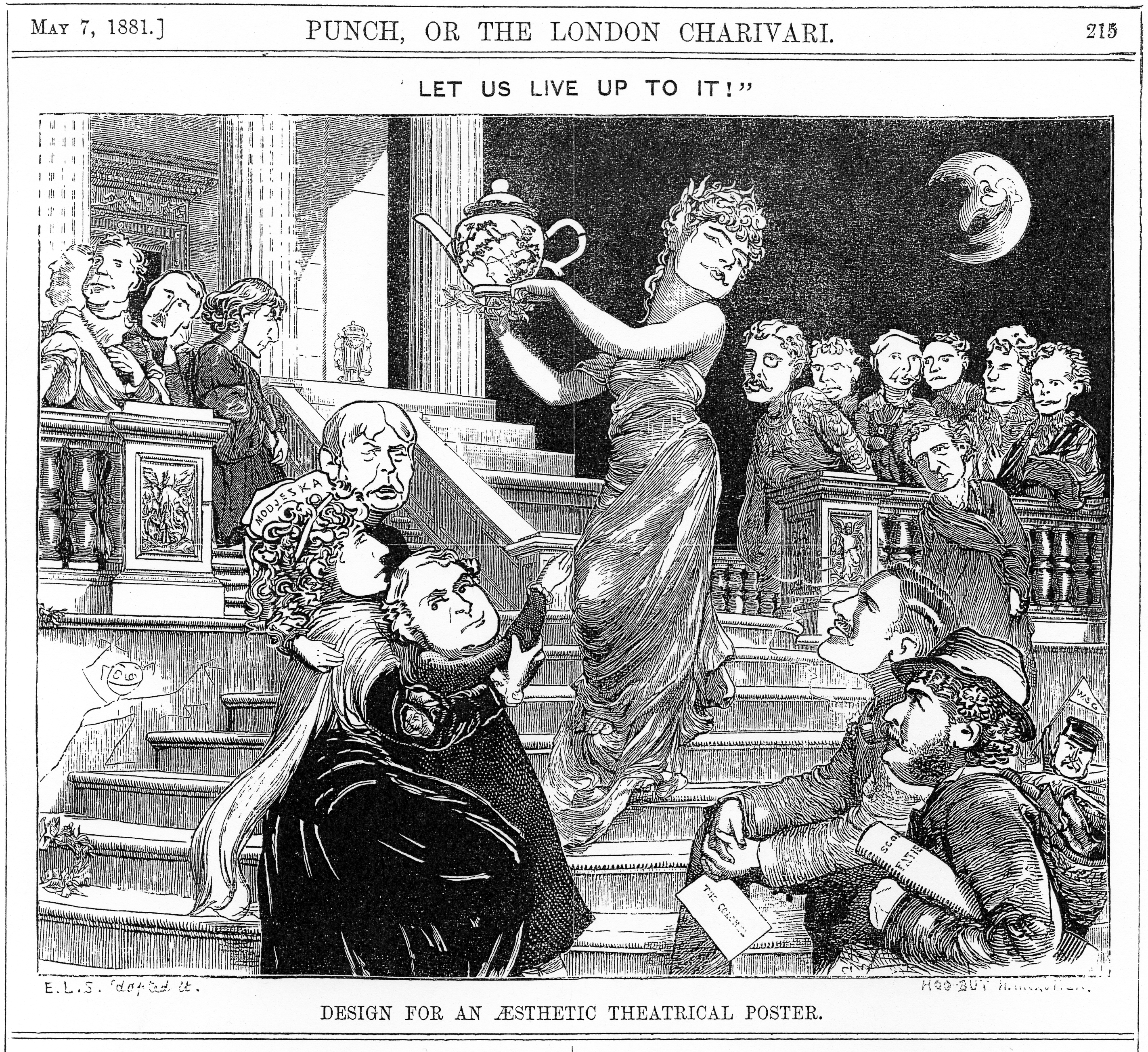
Many Punch cartoons satirised æsthetes. Both Patience and The Colonel are mentioned here. A tiny, pennant-waving Gilbert peeks out of Sullivan's backpack at lower right.

The opera is a satire on the aesthetic movement of the 1870s and '80s in England, part of the 19th-century European movement that emphasised aesthetic values over moral or social themes in literature, fine art, the decorative arts, and interior design. Called "Art for Art's Sake", the movement valued its ideals of beauty above any pragmatic concerns. Although the output of poets, painters and designers was prolific, some argued that the movement's art, poetry and fashion was empty and self-indulgent. That the movement was so popular and also so easy to ridicule as a meaningless fad helped make Patience a big hit. The same factors made a hit out of The Colonel, a play by F. C. Burnand based partly on the satiric cartoons of George du Maurier in Punch magazine. The Colonel beat Patience to the stage by several weeks, but Patience outran Burnand's play. According to Burnand's 1904 memoir, Sullivan's friend the composer Frederic Clay leaked to Burnand the information that Gilbert and Sullivan were working on an "æsthetic subject", and so Burnand raced to produce The Colonel before Patience opened. Modern productions of Patience have sometimes updated the setting of the opera to an analogous era such as the hippie 1960s, making a flower-child poet the rival of a beat poet.

The two poets in the opera are given to reciting their own verses aloud, principally to the admiring chorus of rapturous maidens. The style of poetry Bunthorne declaims strongly contrasts with Grosvenor's. The former's, emphatic and obscure, bears a marked resemblance to Swinburne's poetry in its structure, style and heavy use of alliteration. The latter's "idyllic" poetry, simpler and pastoral, echoes elements of Coventry Patmore and William Morris. Gilbert scholar Andrew Crowther comments, "Bunthorne was the creature of Gilbert's brain, not just a caricature of particular Aesthetes, but an original character in his own right." The makeup and costume adopted by the first Bunthorne, George Grossmith, used Swinburne's velvet jacket, the painter James McNeill Whistler's hairstyle and monocle, and knee-breeches like those worn by Oscar Wilde and others.

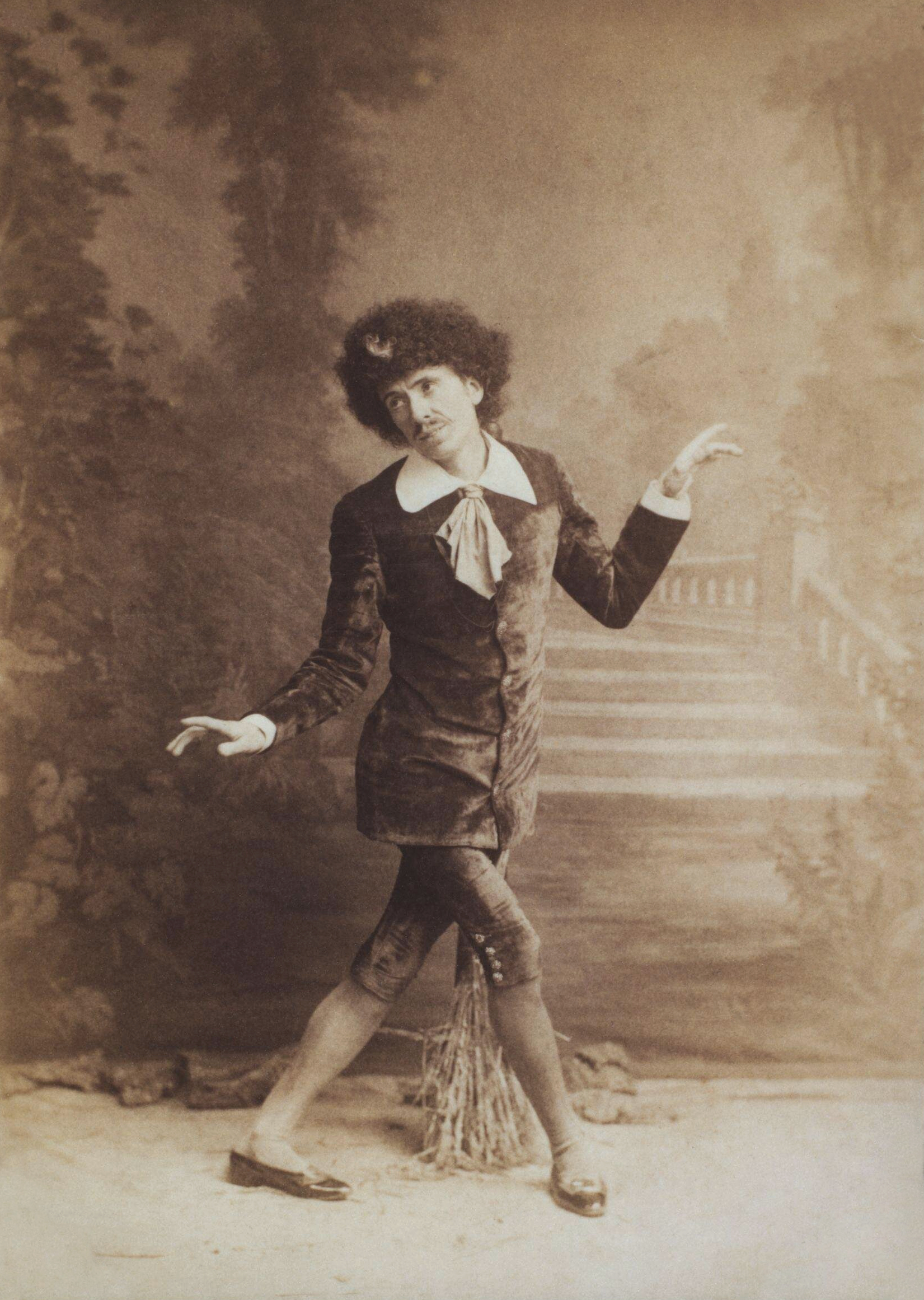
George Grossmith as Bunthorne

According to Gilbert's biographer Edith Browne, the title character, Patience, was made up and costumed to resemble the subject of a Luke Fildes painting. Patience was not the first satire of the aesthetic movement played by Richard D'Oyly Carte's company at the Opera Comique. Grossmith himself had written a sketch in 1876 called Cups and Saucers that was revived as a companion piece to H.M.S. Pinafore in 1878, which was a satire of the blue pottery craze.

A popular misconception holds that the central character of Bunthorne, a "Fleshly Poet," was intended to satirise Oscar Wilde, but this identification is retrospective. According to some authorities, Bunthorne is inspired partly by the poets Algernon Charles Swinburne and Dante Gabriel Rossetti, who were considerably more famous than Wilde in early 1881 before Wilde published his first volume of poetry. Rossetti had been attacked for immorality by Robert Buchanan (under the pseudonym "Thomas Maitland") in an article called "The Fleshly School of Poetry", published in The Contemporary Review for October 1871, a decade before Patience. Nonetheless, Wilde's biographer Richard Ellmann suggests that Wilde is a partial model for both Bunthorne and his rival Grosvenor. Carte, the producer of Patience, was also Wilde's booking manager in 1881 as the poet's popularity took off. In 1882, after the New York production of Patience opened, Carte sent Wilde on a yearlong US lecture tour, with his knee breeches, long hair and other idiosyncratic styling, to discuss poetry and the English aesthetic movement, intending to help popularise the show's American touring productions.

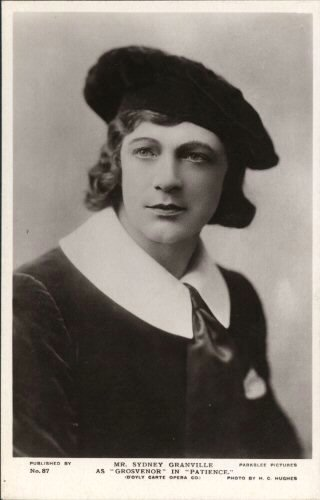
Sydney Granville as Grosvenor

Although a satire of the aesthetic movement is dated today, fads and hero-worship are evergreen, and "Gilbert's pen was rarely sharper than when he invented Reginald Bunthorne". Gilbert originally conceived Patience as a tale of rivalry between two curates and of the doting women who attended upon them. The plot and even some of the dialogue were lifted straight out of Gilbert's Bab Ballad "The Rival Curates". While writing the libretto, however, Gilbert took note of the criticism he had received for his very mild satire of a clergyman in The Sorcerer, and looked about for an alternative pair of rivals. Some remnants of the Bab Ballad version do survive in the final text of Patience. Lady Jane advises Bunthorne to tell Grosvenor: "Your style is much too sanctified – your cut is too canonical!" Later, Grosvenor agrees to change his lifestyle by saying, "I do it on compulsion!" – the very words used by the Reverend Hopley Porter in the Bab Ballad. Gilbert's selection of aesthetic poet rivals proved to be a fertile subject for topsy-turvy treatment. He both mocks and joins in Buchanan's criticism of what the latter calls the poetic "affectations" of the "fleshly school" – their use of archaic terminology, archaic rhymes, the refrain, and especially their "habit of accenting the last syllable in words which in ordinary speech are accented on the penultimate." All of these poetic devices or "mediaevalism's affectations", as Bunthorne calls them, are parodied in Patience. For example, accenting the last syllable of "lily" and rhyming it with "die" parodies two of these devices at once.

On 10 October 1881, during its original run, Patience transferred to the new Savoy Theatre, the first public building in the world lit entirely by electric light. Carte explained why he had introduced electric light: "The greatest drawbacks to the enjoyment of the theatrical performances are, undoubtedly, the foul air and heat which pervade all theatres. As everyone knows, each gas-burner consumes as much oxygen as many people, and causes great heat beside. The incandescent lamps consume no oxygen, and cause no perceptible heat." When the electrical system was ready for full operation, in December 1881, Carte stepped on stage to demonstrate the safety of the new technology by breaking a glowing lightbulb before the audience.

== Roles ==
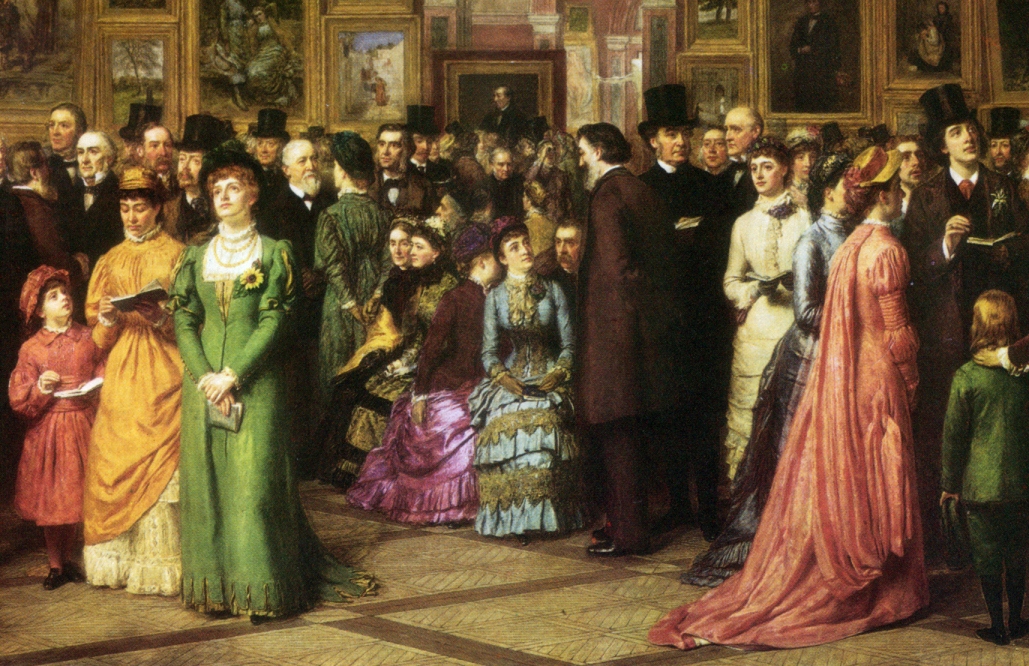
Aesthetic dress (left and right) contrasted with 'fashionable attire' (centre), 1881

- Colonel Calverley (Officer of Dragoon Guards) (bass-baritone)
- Major Murgatroyd (Officer of Dragoon Guards) (baritone)
- Lieut. The Duke of Dunstable (Officer of Dragoon Guards) (tenor)
- Reginald Bunthorne (a Fleshly Poet) (comic baritone)
- Archibald Grosvenor (an Idyllic Poet) (lyric baritone)
- Mr. Bunthorne's Solicitor (silent)
- The Lady Angela (Rapturous Maiden) (mezzo-soprano)
- The Lady Saphir (Rapturous Maiden) (mezzo-soprano or soprano)
- The Lady Ella (Rapturous Maiden) (soprano)
- The Lady Jane (Rapturous Maiden) (contralto)
- Patience (a Dairy Maid) (soprano)
- Chorus of Rapturous Maidens and Officers of Dragoon Guards

== Synopsis ==
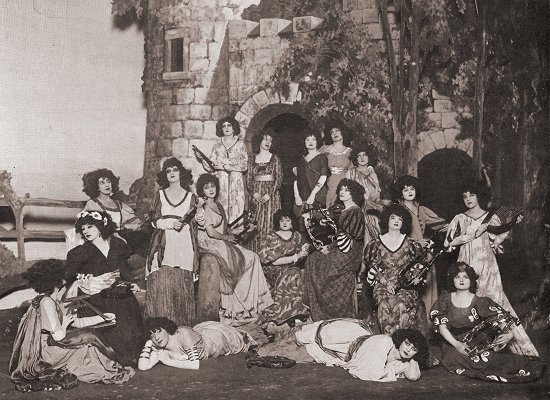
"Rapturous maidens" await Bunthorne

Act I

In front of Castle Bunthorne, a group of "lovesick maidens" are all in love with the aesthetic poet Bunthorne ("Twenty lovesick maidens we"). Lady Jane, the oldest and plainest of them, announces that Bunthorne, far from returning their affections, has his heart set on the simple milkmaid Patience. Patience appears and confesses that she has never loved anyone; she is thankful that love has not turned her miserable as it has them ("I cannot tell what this love may be"). Soon, the lovesick maidens' old sweethearts, the 35th Dragoon Guards, appear ("The soldiers of our Queen"), led by Colonel Calverley ("If you Want a Receipt for that Popular Mystery"), Major Murgatroyd, and the ordinary but immensely rich Lieutenant the Duke of Dunstable. They arrive ready to propose marriage, only to discover their intendeds fawning over Bunthorne, who is in the throes of poetical composition, pretending to ignore the attention of the women thronging around him ("In a doleful train"). Bunthorne reads his poem and departs, while the officers are coldly rebuffed and mocked by their former sweethearts, who turn up their noses at the sight of their red and yellow uniforms. The Dragoons, reeling from the insult, depart ("When I first put this uniform on").

Bunthorne, left alone, confesses that his aestheticism is a sham and mocks the movement's pretensions ("If you're anxious for to shine"). Seeing Patience, he reveals that, like her, he does not like poetry, but she tells him that she cannot love him. Later, Lady Angela, one of Bunthorne's admirers, explores with Patience the latter's childhood crush ("Long years ago"). Lady Angela rhapsodises upon love as the one truly unselfish pursuit in the world. Impressed by her eloquence, Patience promises to fall in love at the earliest opportunity. Serendipitously, Archibald Grosvenor arrives; he is another aesthetic poet who turns out to be Patience's childhood love. He has grown to be the infallible, widely loved "Archibald the All-Right" ("Prithee, pretty maiden"). The two declare themselves in love but are brought up short by the realisation that as Grosvenor is a perfect being, for Patience to love him would be a selfish act, and therefore not true love; thus, they must part.

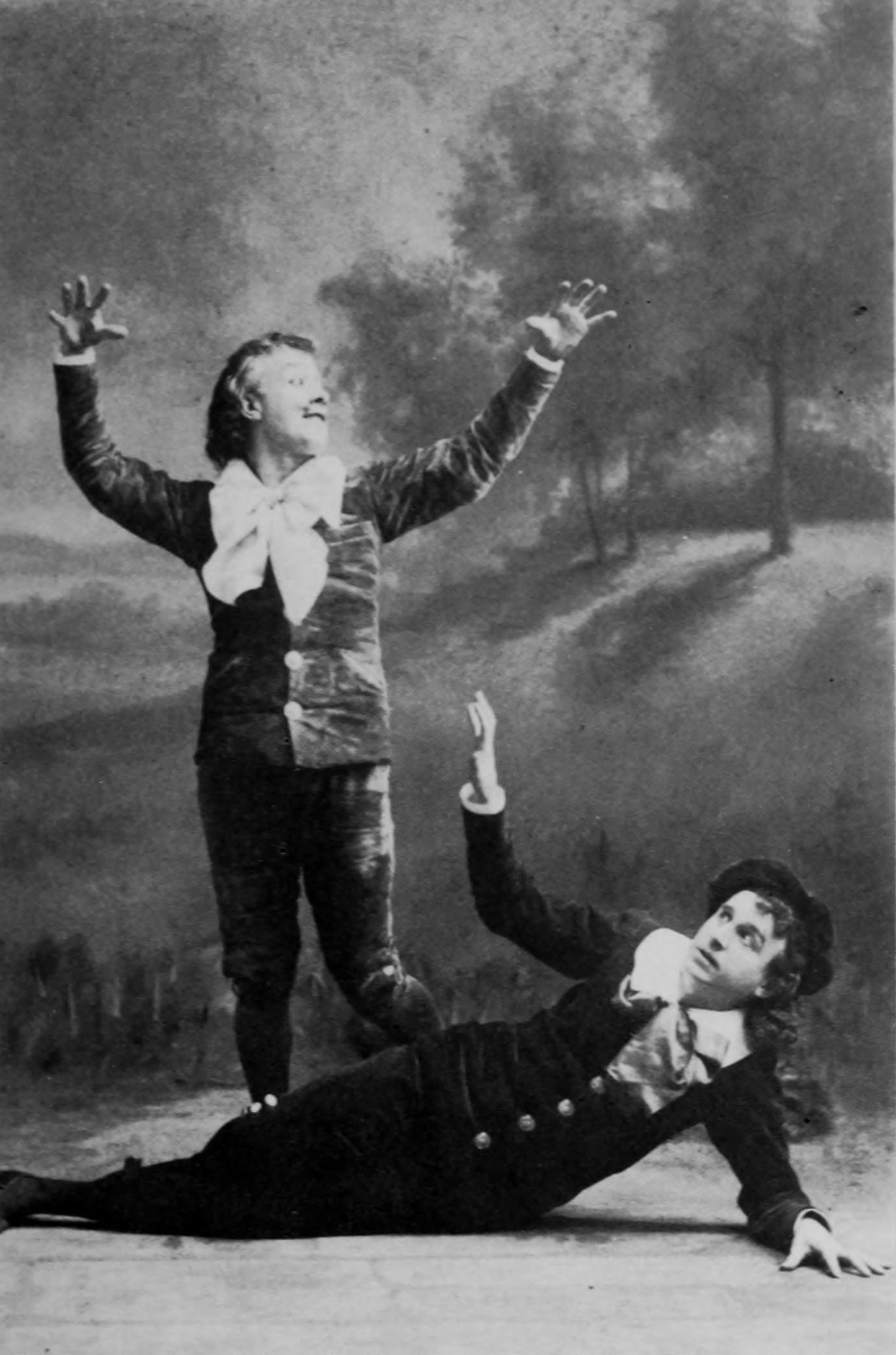
Passmore as Bunthorne "curses" Lytton as Grosvenor

Bunthorne, heartbroken by Patience's rejection, has chosen to raffle himself off among his lady followers ("Let the merry cymbals sound"), the proceeds going to charity. The Dragoons interrupt the proceedings, and, led by the Duke, attempt to reason with the women ("Your maiden hearts, ah, do not steel"), but they are too busy clamouring for raffle tickets to listen ("Come walk up"). Just as Bunthorne is handing the bag to the unattractive Jane, ready for the worst, Patience interrupts the proceedings and proposes to unselfishly sacrifice herself by loving the poet ("True Love must single-hearted be"). A delighted Bunthorne accepts immediately, and his followers, their idol lost, return to the Dragoons to whom they are engaged ("I hear the soft note of the echoing voice"). All seems resolved until Grosvenor enters, and the women, finding him poetic, aesthetic, and far more attractive than Bunthorne, become his partisans instead ("Oh, list while we a love confess"), much to the dismay of the Dragoons, Patience, Bunthorne and especially Grosvenor himself.

Act II

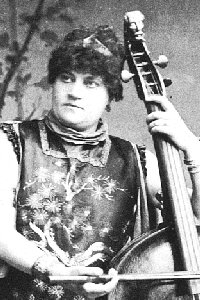
Alice Barnett as Lady Jane

Lady Jane, accompanying herself on the cello, laments the passing of the years and expresses hope that Bunthorne will "secure" her before it is too late ("Silvered is the raven hair"). Meanwhile, Grosvenor wearily entertains the women ("A magnet hung in a hardware shop") and begs to be given a half-holiday from their cloying attentions. Bunthorne is furious when Patience confesses her affection for Grosvenor; she laments the bitter lesson she has learned about love ("Love is a plaintive song"). Bunthorne longs to regain his former admirers' admiration; Jane offers her assistance ("So go to him, and say to him"). The Dragoon officers attempt to earn their partners' love by appearing to convert to the principles of aestheticism ("It's clear that mediaeval art"). Angela and Saphir are favourably impressed and accept Calverly and Murgatroyd in matrimony; Dunstable graciously bows out ("If Saphir I choose to marry").

Bunthorne threatens Grosvenor with a dire curse unless he undertakes to become perfectly commonplace. Intimidated, and also pleased at the excuse to escape the celebrity caused by his "fatal beauty", Grosvenor agrees ("When I go out of door"). This plot backfires, however, when Grosvenor reappears as an ordinary man; the women follow him into ordinariness, becoming "matter-of-fact young girls." Patience realises that Grosvenor has lost his perfection, and so it will no longer be selfish for her to marry him, which she undertakes to do without delay. The women, following suit, return to their old fiancés among the Dragoons. In the spirit of fairness, Dunstable chooses the "plain" Lady Jane as his bride for her very lack of appeal. Bunthorne is left with the "vegetable love" that he had (falsely) claimed to desire. Thus, "Nobody [is] Bunthorne's bride."

== Musical numbers ==
Excerpts from the 1921 His Master's Voice recording of the opera
When I first put this uniform on ... Am I alone and unobserved

Love is a plaintive song ... So go to him and say to him

When I go out of door ... I'm a Waterloo House young man ... After much debate internal

- Overture (includes "Turn, oh turn, in this direction", "So go to him and say to him", and "Oh list while we a love confess"). The Overture was prepared by Eugen d'Albert, who was then a pupil of Sullivan's, based on Sullivan's sketch.

Act I

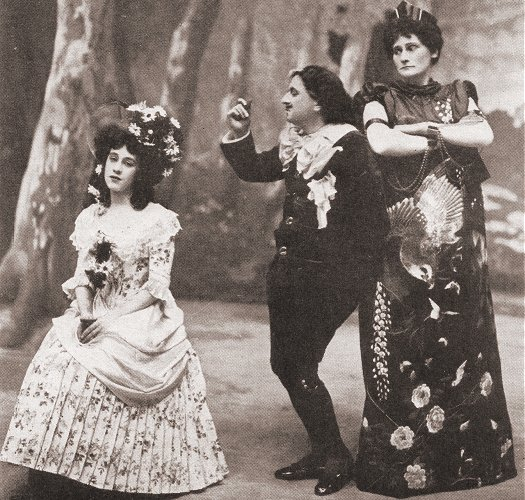
"...and here we are!" (left to right: Dow, Workman and René, 1907)

- 1. "Twenty love-sick maidens we" (Angela, Ella and Chorus of Maidens)
- 2. "Still brooding on their mad infatuation" (Patience, Saphir, Angela, and Chorus)
- 2a. "I cannot tell what this love may be" (Patience and Chorus)
- 2b. "Twenty love-sick maidens we" (Chorus of Maidens – Exit)
- 3. "The soldiers of our Queen" (Chorus of Dragoons)
- 3a. "If you want a receipt for that popular mystery" (Colonel and Chorus)^{1}
- 4. "In a doleful train two and two we walk" (Angela, Ella, Saphir, Bunthorne, and Chorus of Maidens and Dragoons)
- 4a. "Twenty love-sick maidens we" (Chorus of Maidens – Exit)
- 5. "When I first put this uniform on" (Colonel and Chorus of Dragoons)
- 6. "Am I alone and unobserved?" (Bunthorne)
- 7. "Long years ago, fourteen maybe" (Patience and Angela)
- 8. "Prithee, pretty maiden" (Patience and Grosvenor)
- 8a. "Though to marry you would very selfish be" (Patience and Grosvenor)
- 9. "Let the merry cymbals sound" (Ensemble)

^{1} This was originally followed by a song for the Duke, "Though men of rank may useless seem." The orchestration survives in Sullivan's autograph score, but without a vocal line. There have been several attempts at a reconstruction, including one by David Russell Hulme that was included on the 1994 new D'Oyly Carte Opera Company recording.

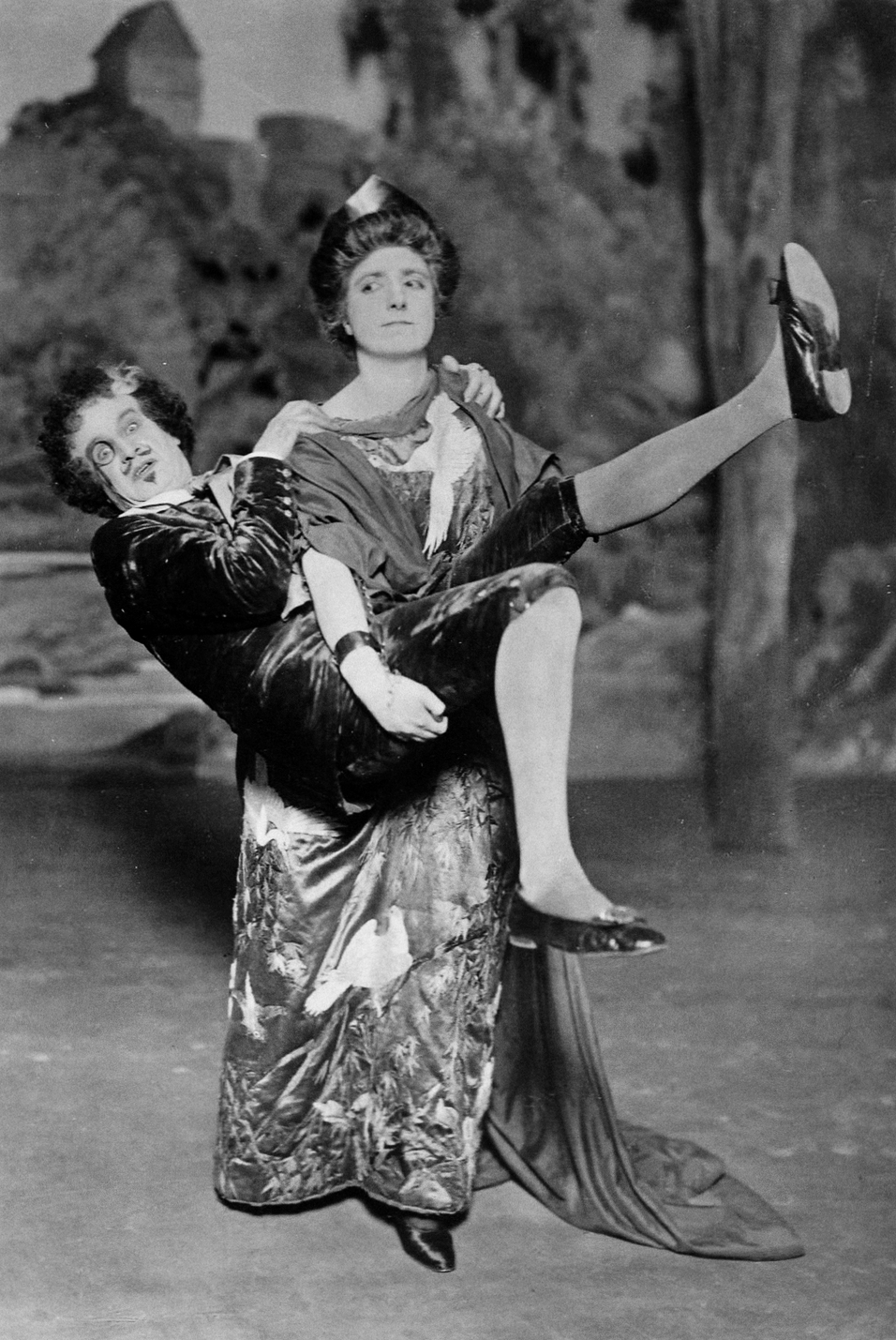
"...sing 'boo' to you" (Lytton and Lewis, 1919)

Act II

- 10. "On such eyes as maidens cherish" (Chorus of Maidens)
- 11. "Sad is that woman's lot" (Jane)
- 12. "Turn, oh turn, in this direction" (Chorus of Maidens)
- 13. "A magnet hung in a hardware shop" (Grosvenor and Chorus of Maidens)
- 14. "Love is a plaintive song" (Patience)
- 15. "So go to him, and say to him" (Jane and Bunthorne)
- 16. "It's clear that mediaeval art" (Duke, Major, and Colonel)
- 17. "If Saphir I choose to marry" (Angela, Saphir, Duke, Major, and Colonel)
- 18. "When I go out of door" (Bunthorne and Grosvenor)
- 19. "I'm a Waterloo House young man" (Grosvenor and Chorus of Maidens)
- 20. "After much debate internal" (Ensemble)

Note on topical references: Songs and dialogue in Patience contain many topical references to persons and events of public interest in 1881. In particular, the Colonel's song, Act I, item 3a above, is almost entirely composed of such references. The Wikisource text of the opera contains links explaining these references.

== Production history ==
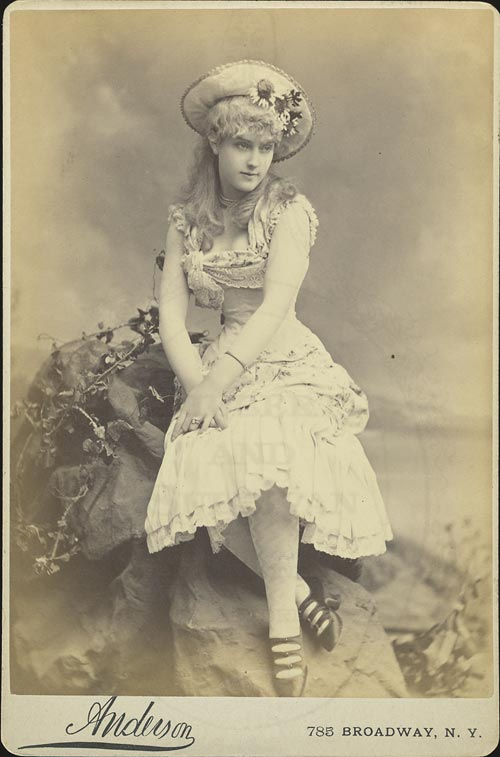
Lillian Russell as Patience at the Bijou Opera House in New York, 1882

The original run of Patience in London, split across two theatres, was the second longest of the Gilbert and Sullivan series, eclipsed only by The Mikado. The original sets were designed by John O'Connor. Its first London revival was in 1900, making it the last of the revivals for which all three partners (Gilbert, Sullivan, and D'Oyly Carte) were alive. At that time, Gilbert admitted some doubts as to whether the æsthetic subject would still be appreciated, years after the fad had died out. Gilbert wrote to Sullivan after the premiere of this revival (which the composer was too ill to attend), "The old opera woke up splendidly."

In the British provinces, Patience played – either by itself, or in repertory – continuously from summer 1881 to 1885, then again in 1888. It rejoined the touring repertory in 1892 and was included in every season until 1955–56. New costumes were designed in 1907 by Percy Anderson, in 1918 by Hugo Rumbold and in 1928 by George Sheringham, who also designed a new set that year. New designs by Peter Goffin debuted in 1957. The opera returned to its regular place in the repertory, apart from a break in 1962–63. Late in the company's history, it toured a reduced set of operas to reduce costs. Patience had its final D'Oyly Carte performances in April 1979 and was left out of the company's last three seasons of touring.

In America, Richard D'Oyly Carte mounted a production at the Standard Theatre in September 1881, six months after the London premiere. One of the "pirated" American productions of Patience starred the young Lillian Russell. In Australia, the opera's first authorised performance was on 26 November 1881 at the Theatre Royal, Sydney, produced by J. C. Williamson.

Patience entered the repertory of the English National Opera in 1969, in an acclaimed production with Derek Hammond-Stroud as Bunthorne. The production was later mounted in Australia and was preserved on video as part of the Brent Walker series. In 1984, ENO also took the production on tour to the Metropolitan Opera House, in New York City.

The following table shows the history of the D'Oyly Carte productions in Gilbert's lifetime:

Theatre	Opening Date	Closing Date	Perfs.	Details
Opera Comique	23 April 1881	8 October 1881	170	
Savoy Theatre	10 October 1881	22 November 1882	408	
Standard Theatre, New York	22 September 1881	23 March 1882	177	Authorised American production
Savoy Theatre	7 November 1900	20 April 1901	150	First London revival
Savoy Theatre	4 April 1907	24 August 1907	51	First Savoy repertory season; played with three other operas. Closing date shown is of the entire season.

== Historical casting ==
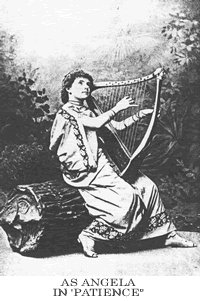
Jessie Bond as Lady Angela

The following tables show the casts of the principal original productions and D'Oyly Carte Opera Company touring repertory at various times through to the company's 1982 closure:

Role	Opera Comique 1881	Standard Theatre 1881	Savoy Theatre 1900	Savoy Theatre 1907
Colonel	Richard Temple	William T. Carleton	Jones Hewson	Frank Wilson
Major	Frank Thornton	Arthur Wilkinson	W. H. Leon	Richard Andean
Duke	Durward Lely	Llewellyn Cadwaladr	Robert Evett	Harold Wilde
Bunthorne	George Grossmith	J. H. Ryley	Walter Passmore	Charles H. Workman
Grosvenor	Rutland Barrington	James Barton Key	Henry Lytton	John Clulow
Solicitor	George Bowley	William White	H. Carlyle Pritchard	Ronald Greene
Angela	Jessie Bond	Alice Burville	Blanche Gaston-Murray	Jessie Rose
Saphir	Julia Gwynne	Rose Chapelle	Lulu Evans	Marie Wilson
Ella	May Fortescue	Alma Stanley	Agnes Fraser	Ruby Gray
Jane	Alice Barnett	Augusta Roche	Rosina Brandram	Louie René
Patience	Leonora Braham	Carrie Burton	Isabel Jay	Clara Dow

Role	D'Oyly Carte 1915 Tour	D'Oyly Carte 1925 Tour	D'Oyly Carte 1935 Tour	D'Oyly Carte 1945 Tour
Colonel	Frederick Hobbs	Darrell Fancourt	Darrell Fancourt	Darrell Fancourt
Major	Allen Morris	Martyn Green	Frank Steward	C. William Morgan
Duke	Dewey Gibson	Charles Goulding	John Dean	Herbert Garry
Bunthorne	Henry Lytton	Henry Lytton	Martyn Green	Grahame Clifford
Grosvenor	Leicester Tunks	Henry Millidge	Leslie Rands	Leslie Rands
Solicitor	E. A. Cotton	Alex Sheahan	W. F. Hodgkins	Ernest Dale
Angela	Nellie Briercliffe	Aileen Davies	Marjorie Eyre	Marjorie Eyre
Saphir	Ella Milne	Beatrice Elburn	Elizabeth Nickell-Lean	Doreen Binnion
Ella	Phyllis Smith	Irene Hill	Margery Abbott	Rosalie Dyer
Jane	Bertha Lewis	Bertha Lewis	Dorothy Gill	Ella Halman
Patience	Elsie McDermid	Winifred Lawson	Doreen Denny	Margery Abbott

Role	D'Oyly Carte 1950 Tour	D'Oyly Carte 1957 Tour	D'Oyly Carte 1965 Tour	D'Oyly Carte 1975 Tour
Colonel	Darrell Fancourt	Donald Adams	Donald Adams	John Ayldon
Major	Peter Pratt	John Reed	Alfred Oldridge	James Conroy-Ward
Duke	Leonard Osborn	Leonard Osborn	Philip Potter	Meston Reid
Bunthorne	Martyn Green	Peter Pratt	John Reed	John Reed
Grosvenor	Alan Styler	Arthur Richards	Kenneth Sandford	Kenneth Sandford
Solicitor	Ernest Dale	Wilfred Stelfox	Jon Ellison	Jon Ellison
Angela	Joan Gillingham	Beryl Dixon	Peggy Ann Jones	Judi Merri
Saphir	Joyce Wright	Elizabeth Howarth	Pauline Wales	Patricia Leonard
Ella	Muriel Harding	Jean Hindmarsh	Valerie Masterson	Rosalind Griffiths
Jane	Ella Halman	Ann Drummond-Grant	Christene Palmer	Lyndsie Holland
Patience	Margaret Mitchell	Cynthia Morey	Ann Hood	Pamela Field

== Recordings ==
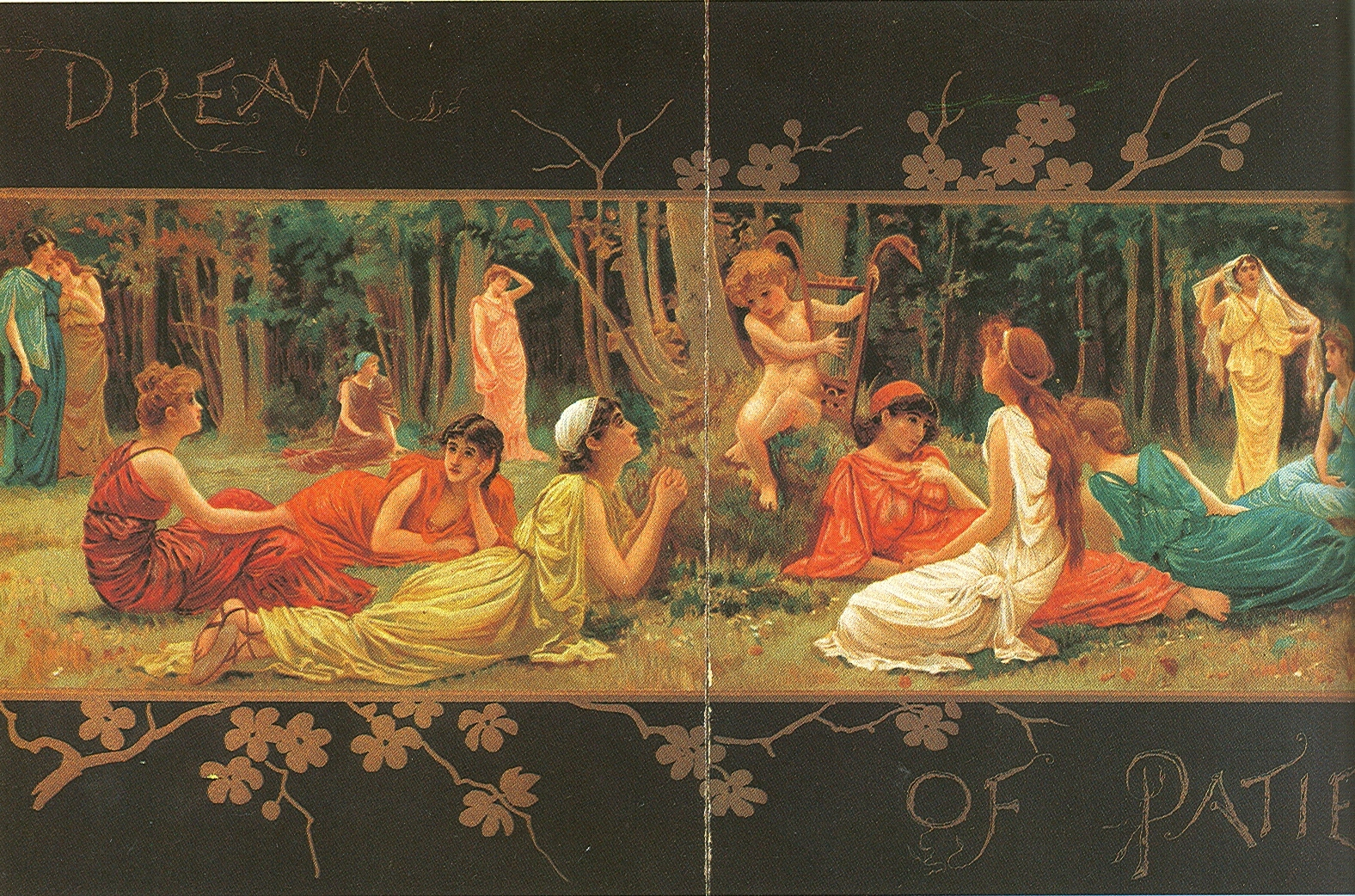
Illustration from an 1885 programme

Of the recordings of this opera, the 1961 D'Oyly Carte Opera Company recording (with complete dialogue) has been the best received. Two videos, Brent Walker (1982) and Australian Opera (1995), are both based on the respected English National Opera production first seen in the 1970s. A D'Oyly Carte production was broadcast on BBC2 television on 27 December 1965, but the recording is believed lost. Several professional productions have been recorded on video by the International Gilbert and Sullivan Festival since 2000.

Selected recordings

- 1930 D'Oyly Carte – Conductor: Malcolm Sargent
- 1951 D'Oyly Carte – Conductor: Isidore Godfrey
- 1961 D'Oyly Carte (with dialogue) – New Symphony Orchestra of London; Conductor: Isidore Godfrey
- 1962 Sargent/Glyndebourne – Pro Arte Orchestra, Glyndebourne Festival Chorus; Conductor: Sir Malcolm Sargent
- 1982 Brent Walker Productions (video) – Ambrosian Opera Chorus, London Symphony Orchestra; Conductor: Alexander Faris; Stage Director: John Cox
- 1994 New D'Oyly Carte – Conductor: John Owen Edwards
- 1995 Australian Opera (video) – Conductor: David Stanhope; Stage Director: John Cox

Oscar Brand and Joni Mitchell recorded "Prithee Pretty Maiden" for the Canadian folk music TV program Let's Sing Out, broadcast by CBC Television in 1966.

== See also ==
- Grosvenor Gallery
