= W. H. Trood =

English painter

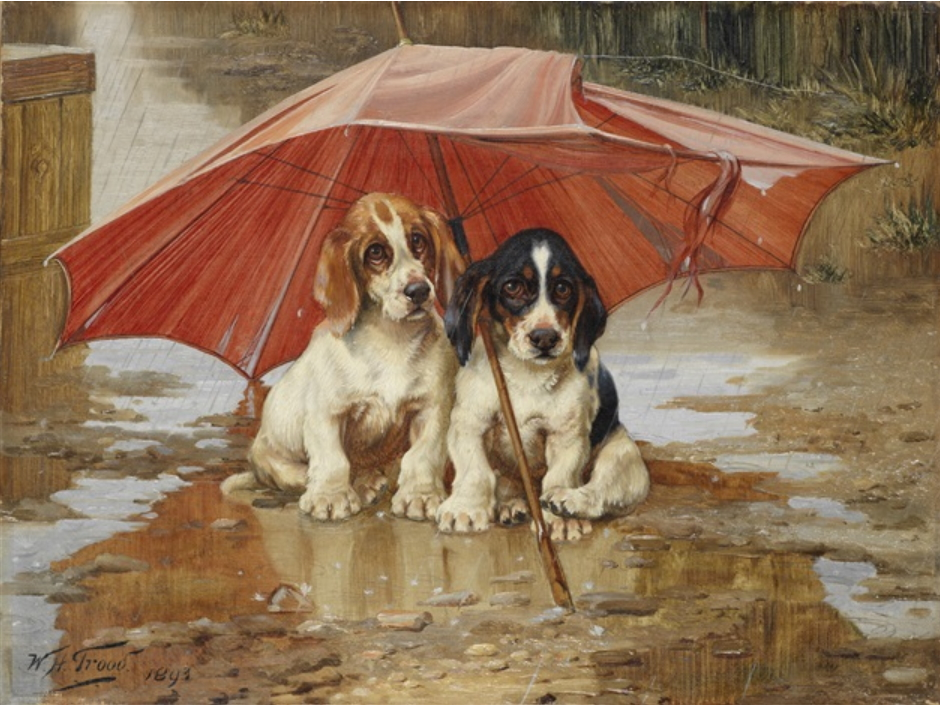
"Wait till the clouds roll by": an 1893 painting by Trood

William Henry Hamilton Trood (1859 – 2 November 1899) was an English artist of the latter half of the 19th century.

Trood was born in Taunton, Somerset, the son of William and Myra Jane Trood. He is described in The Dictionary of Victorian Painters (1978) as a painter of animals, especially dogs. The dictionary adds, "His pictures usually have sentimental titles", e.g. 'A Coveted Bone', 'The Old Man's Darling', 'Home Sweet Home' etc.". According to an obituary notice in 1899, "in thousands of homes throughout England one may see his work. Perhaps the most popular of all his productions is the picture entitled 'Cause and Effect', a study of some puppies frightened by a soda-water bottle which has burst."

In addition to being a popular painter of animals, Trood was well known as an Orientalist. For several years he travelled in the east and Africa, amassing a collection of arms and armour. The obituarist remarked that Trood's achievements were remarkable for one "born deaf and dumb".

Trood worked in Chelsea for many years. He died of pneumonia in Taunton, aged 39.

== References and sources ==
=== Sources ===
- Wood, Christopher (1978). The Dictionary of Victorian Painters. Woodbridge: Antique Collectors' Club. ISBN 0902028723.
