= Marjorie Eyre =

British opera singer and actress (1897–1987)

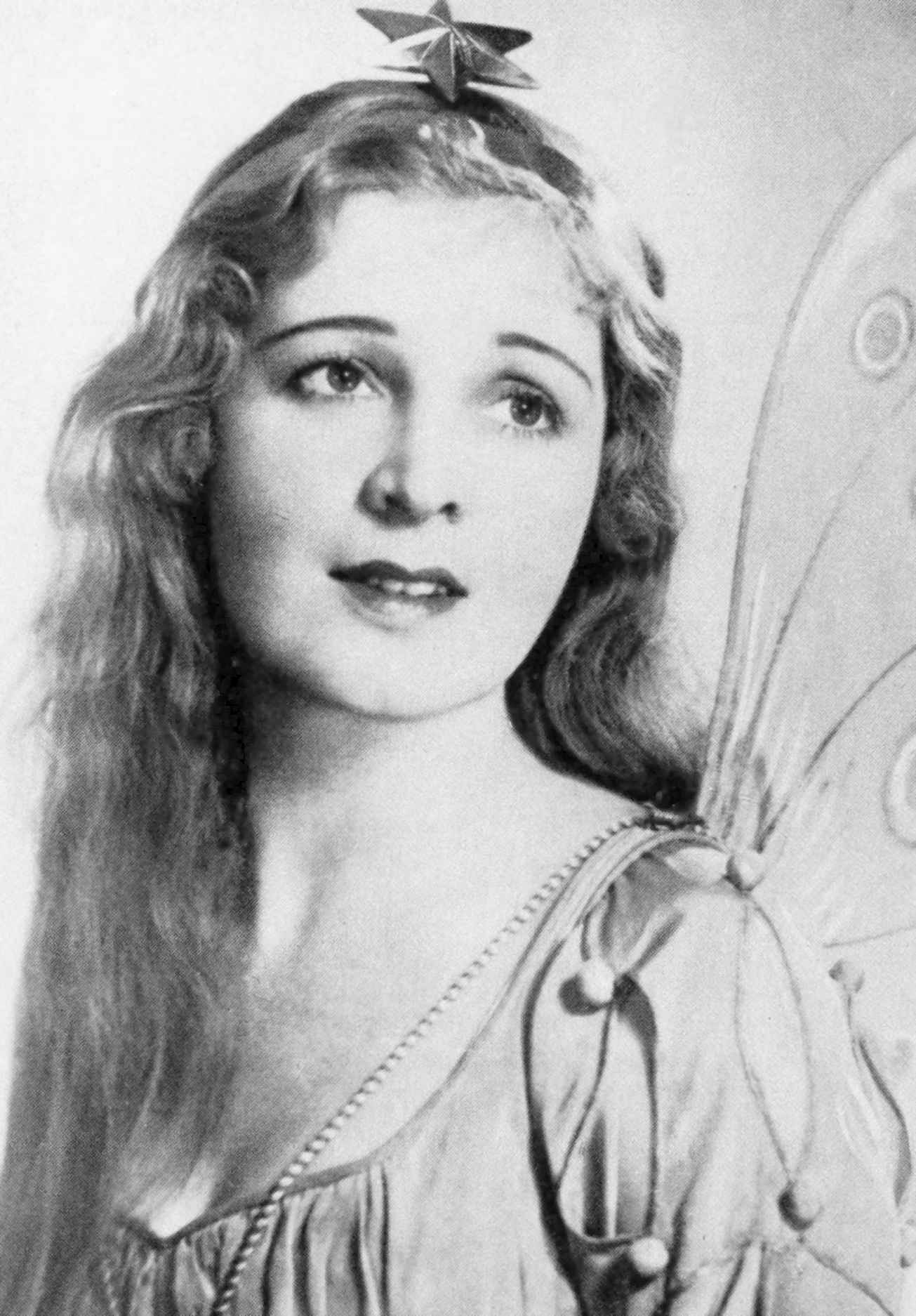
Eyre as the title character in Iolanthe, ca. 1936

Marjorie Eyre-Parker (1897 – 3 December 1987) was an English singer and actress, best known for her performances in first the soprano, and later the mezzo-soprano, roles of the Savoy operas. She performed with the D'Oyly Carte Opera Company for more than two decades and later performed with the J. C. Williamson Gilbert and Sullivan Opera Company. She married another D'Oyly Carte performer, Leslie Rands, in 1926.

== Life and career ==
Eyre was born and raised in Derby, England, and studied at the Royal College of Music.

=== D'Oyly Carte years ===
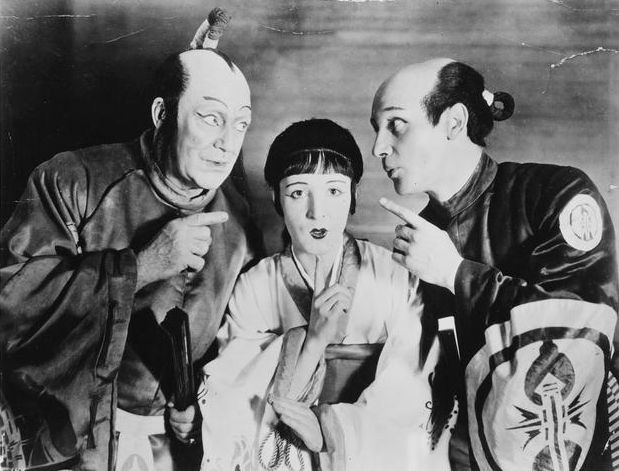
Eyre as Pitti-Sing in The Mikado, alongside Sydney Granville as Pooh-Bah and Martyn Green as Ko-Ko, 1936

Eyre joined the D'Oyly Carte Opera Company in 1924 playing chorus roles and taking the small part of Giulia in The Gondoliers. In 1925 in one of the D'Oyly Carte touring companies, she took over her first leading soprano role, Yum-Yum in The Mikado, and also was given the small parts of Lady Ella in Patience and Celia (and, sometimes, Phyllis) in Iolanthe. In 1926, she moved up from Ella to the title role in Patience. Later that year, she was also given the leading soprano roles of Rose Maybud in Ruddigore and Gianetta The Gondoliers. That year she also married a fellow member of the company, Leslie Rands. Later in their careers, the two would often be paired on stage. In 1927, Eyre returned to the main company where, in 1928, she was sharing Patience, Phyllis, Yum-Yum, Rose and Gianetta.

In 1929 Rupert D'Oyly Carte decided to assign mezzo-soprano roles to Eyre and sent her to study with a voice teacher to lower her range to prepare for her new assignments and became the company's principal soubrette, playing Cousin Hebe in H.M.S. Pinafore, Edith in The Pirates of Penzance, Saphir in Patience, the title role in Iolanthe, Pitti-Sing in The Mikado, Mad Margaret in Ruddigore, and Tessa in The Gondoliers. Nellie Briercliffe played the last four of those roles from October 1929 to May 1930, but Eyre played Constance in The Sorcerer instead. In 1930, Eyre resumed all her principal soubrette roles, except switching to Lady Angela in Patience and adding Melissa in Princess Ida and Phoebe Meryll in The Yeomen of the Guard.

She played these all of the mezzo-soprano roles for the next 15 seasons (except when she gave up Iolanthe and Pitti-Sing for two seasons and Edith for one), until she left the D'Oyly Carte Opera Company in 1946. Eugene Burr, in The Billboard, praised her performance as Tessa in The Gondoliers during the company's American tour in 1936. She was known for her "economy of gesture", comic timing and ability to convey emotion.

=== Later years ===
Eyre and Rands moved to a new home in Sussex in 1947. In 1949, they joined other former members of the D'Oyly Carte, Richard Walker, Helen Roberts, John Dean and Anna Bethell, in Australia, where they were engaged by Frank Tait for a Gilbert and Sullivan tour of Australia and New Zealand with the J. C. Williamson Gilbert and Sullivan Opera Company. They performed in Australasia until 1951. In 1952, Rands and Eyre played the Earl of Essex and Jill-All-Alone in a week's run of Merrie England for charity in Priory Park, Chichester.

Eyre continued to be interested in Gilbert and Sullivan performances in later years and served as a vice-president of the Gilbert & Sullivan Society in London until her death, at the age of 90.

Eyre died in Brighton.

== Recordings ==
Her recordings with D'Oyly Carte included only Lady Saphir in Patience (1930) and Pitti-Sing in The Mikado (1936).

== See also ==
- J. C. Williamson

== Sources ==
- Ayre, Leslie (1972). The Gilbert & Sullivan Companion. London: W.H. Allen & Co Ltd. Introduction by Martyn Green.
