= Richard Watson (bass) =

Watson as King Hildebrand in Princess Ida, c. 1932, one of Watson's first roles with the D'Oyly Carte Opera Company

Richard Charles Watson (1903 – 2 August 1968) was an Australian bass opera and concert singer and actor. He is probably best remembered for his performances and recordings of the comic bass-baritone roles of the Gilbert and Sullivan operas with the D'Oyly Carte Opera Company, but he appeared in a wide range of operas at the Royal Opera House and with the Carl Rosa Opera Company with such singers as Lotte Lehmann and Lauritz Melchior, under conductors including Sir Thomas Beecham and Bruno Walter.

He recorded some operatic music, and more than half a dozen of his recordings with D'Oyly Carte remain in print, including his 1932 recording of King Hildebrand in Princess Ida and his recordings of the Learned Judge, Sergeant of Police, Pooh-Bah, Sir Despard Murgatroyd, Wilfred Shadbolt and Don Alhambra, released in 1949 and 1950.

== Biography ==
=== Early years ===
Watson was born in Adelaide. After training at the Elder Conservatorium, he taught locally before being awarded a scholarship to the Royal College of Music in London in 1925. He also studied with the baritone Dinh Gilly.

He made his London stage debut in a one-off charity matinée performance of a musical fantasy called The Ladder at Daly's Theatre in June 1927, in a cast led by Maggie Teyte. Also in the cast was Walter Johnstone-Douglas, who had taught Watson at the Royal College. He engaged Watson to appear in 1928 in a company including Astra Desmond, Roy Henderson and Steuart Wilson, performing in a season of operas at the Royal Court Theatre, London, in Così fan tutte, Master Peter's Puppet Show, The Secret Marriage, and Vaughan Williams's new opera, The Shepherds of the Delectable Mountains. Later that year, he sang in Charpentier's Louise, conducted by Malcolm Sargent.

In 1929 Watson played Falstaff in the original production of Vaughan Williams's Sir John in Love, conducted by Sargent. Later in the year, he sang in The Tales of Hoffmann with the Carl Rosa Opera Company and then joined the Covent Garden Opera touring company, under John Barbirolli, in a wide repertory from Wagner (The Mastersingers), to Verdi (Falstaff), to verismo (Cavalleria rusticana and Pagliacci).

Watson was invited to sing with the international opera company at Covent Garden in the summer of 1930. He performed in Debussy's Pelléas et Mélisande and in Die Meistersinger (this time in German) under Bruno Walter. The latter was broadcast live by the BBC. After the international season, Watson again joined the touring company, performing in a range of operas, including Turandot, Rigoletto, Aida and Tosca, which were relayed by the BBC. In 1932, he sang in Sir Thomas Beecham's Wagner festival at Covent Garden, in a company headed by Lotte Lehmann, Frida Leider, Lauritz Melchior and Friedrich Schorr. All the main Wagner operas were performed, with the exceptions of Parsifal (which Beecham never conducted) and Lohengrin; Watson appeared in every production.

From the late 1920s and throughout the 1930s, Watson was in demand as a concert singer and as a broadcasting and recording artist. He sang in Elgar's The Apostles, in Worcester Cathedral under Sir Ivor Atkins, Schubert's Mass in A-flat under Adrian Boult with the Bach Choir, Handel's Judas Maccabaeus, and the Verdi Requiem.

=== D'Oyly Carte and later career ===
In August 1932, Watson joined the D'Oyly Carte Opera Company, remaining with the company for two years. His roles were Private Willis in Iolanthe and King Hildebrand in Princess Ida, which he took over from the company's veteran bass-baritone Sydney Granville, and the Lieutenant of the Tower in The Yeomen of the Guard, previously played by Leslie Rands. In December 1932, when The Sorcerer was revived, he was also given the small role of the Notary; in June 1933 he took over the role of Old Adam in Ruddigore. During his two seasons, he also deputised occasionally for Darrell Fancourt as the Pirate King in The Pirates of Penzance and for Granville as Don Alhambra, the Grand Inquisitor, in The Gondoliers.

In June 1934, Watson left D'Oyly Carte to rejoin the Carl Rosa company, touring for six months in a range of operas including Wagner's Tannhäuser. At the end of the tour, he returned to Australia, touring with the J. C. Williamson Company in 1935–36 in the Gilbert and Sullivan operas, and three other pieces, Lilac Time, The Chocolate Soldier, and a rare revival of Robert Planquette's Paul Jones. Also in the company were other former D'Oyly Carte performers, including Winifred Lawson and Ivan Menzies. Watson played Bouncer in Cox and Box, the Learned Judge in Trial by Jury, the Sergeant of Police in The Pirates of Penzance, Colonel Calverley in Patience, Pooh-Bah in The Mikado, Sir Despard Murgatroyd in Ruddigore, Shadbolt in The Yeomen of the Guard, and Don Alhambra in The Gondoliers.

Watson returned to England in 1936, and from then to 1939 appeared in concerts and operas, including a last-minute engagement to sing in The Bartered Bride at Covent Garden when the singer cast as Krušina fell ill. Watson and another bass, Booth Hitchen, learned the role within 24 hours, rehearsed by Beecham, and played the role for one act each. Watson then returned to Australia for another Williamson tour. During the tour, he added the Savoy opera roles of Doctor Daly in The Sorcerer and Bill Bobstay in H.M.S. Pinafore to his repertory. In December 1940, Watson married Joyce Armitage Tapson in Melbourne. In 1943, he was appointed principal teacher of singing at his old college, the Elder Conservatorium.

In September 1947, Watson returned to England and rejoined the D'Oyly Carte company. His roles were Bouncer, Private Willis (both shared with Richard Walker), the Learned Judge, Captain Corcoran in Pinafore, Pooh-Bah, the Lieutenant, and Don Alhambra. He substituted for Fancourt in the 1947–48 season as the Pirate King. Walker, finding so many of his roles given to Watson, soon left the company, and Watson then took over Walker's remaining roles of Sergeant of Police in Pirates and Shadbolt in Yeomen. In the 1947–48 season, Watson gave up the role of Captain Corcoran and played Bill Bobstay in Pinafore. He also filled in on occasion for Fancourt as Colonel Calverley in Patience. From November 1948, Watson also appeared as Sir Despard in Ruddigore. He played most of these roles for his last three seasons with the company.

Watson left for the second and last time at the end of the company's London season at the Savoy Theatre in August 1951. In 1949, the company had engaged Eleanor Evans as Stage Director. The choice was highly unpopular among the actors and contributed to a wave of defections, including the company's principal comedian, Martyn Green. Green wrote: "Discontent grew, changes were constantly taking place, and criticism became rampant. ... [Evans's methods] suggest a complete lack of knowledge, evidenced ... by constant self-contradiction. There were other accusations levelled against her, of a more serious nature". In addition to Green, "Ella Halman left too. So did Richard Watson ... Radley Flynn and no fewer than twenty-two other small part players and choristers. It was the largest single exodus of performers in D'Oyly Carte history".

=== Last years ===
From 1951 to 1955, Watson was Director of the Regina Conservatory of Music at the University of Saskatchewan in Canada. He returned to Australia and made a final tour with the Williamson company from 1956 to 1958, playing his accustomed Gilbert and Sullivan roles. After this, Watson returned to teaching at the Elder Conservatorium in his native Adelaide and lead the Gilbert & Sullivan Society South Australia. In the early 1960s, Watson played his last known part, as Bumble the beadle in the original Australian production of Lionel Bart's Oliver!.

Watson died in Adelaide in 1968, aged 65.

== Recordings ==
Watson made numerous recordings for the Decca company. In the 1930s he made a series of recordings of operatic numbers and a few old ballads. Operatic solos included arias from Mozart's The Seraglio and The Magic Flute and Basilio's "Calumny" aria from Rossini's The Barber of Seville and, later, bass solos from works by Gounod and Bizet. He took part in recordings of duets and ensemble numbers from operas by Verdi, Puccini and Gounod; and, with Steuart Wilson and the pianist Gerald Moore and others, Brahms's Liebeslieder-Walzer.

In 1932, Watson recorded King Hildebrand in Princess Ida with the D'Oyly Carte Opera Company. Watson's second engagement with D'Oyly Carte coincided with an intensive period of recording by Decca of the main works of the Gilbert and Sullivan canon. He recorded the roles of the Learned Judge, Sergeant of Police, Pooh-Bah, Sir Despard, Shadbolt and Don Alhambra, released in 1949 and 1950. Of his Sergeant of Police on the 1949 Pirates recording, one reviewer wrote, "the chief glory of this recording is Richard Watson's Sergeant of Police. This performance alone makes the set worthwhile having."
