= Ann Drummond-Grant =

British singer and actress (1905–1959)

Ann Drummond-Grant as the Fairy Queen in Iolanthe

Ann Drummond-Grant (20 November 1904 – 11 September 1959) was a British singer and actress, best known for her performances in contralto roles of the Gilbert and Sullivan operas with the D'Oyly Carte Opera Company.

Drummond-Grant began her career as a soprano. She joined D'Oyly Carte in 1933, playing smaller roles, and eventually progressed to leading soprano roles. She left the company in 1938. During World War II she toured in a variety of theatrical shows. She married the D'Oyly Carte musical director, Isidore Godfrey, in 1940, and returned to the company in 1950 as a contralto, playing Gilbert's formidable older women, until shortly before her death at the age of 54.

== Life and career ==
Drummond-Grant was born in Edinburgh and studied singing in Scotland. She sang for five years as leading soprano in a parish church, played in small opera and musical comedy troupes, and did some concert work and broadcasting.

=== Soprano years ===
In 1933, Drummond-Grant joined the D'Oyly Carte Opera Company chorus. In 1936 she began to play the small parts of Celia in Iolanthe, Zorah in Ruddigore, and Fiametta in The Gondoliers. She soon moved up to the larger roles of Plaintiff in Trial by Jury and Lady Psyche in Princess Ida, and she also made occasional appearances in the leading soprano roles of Josephine in H.M.S. Pinafore, the title roles in Patience and Princess Ida, and Gianetta in The Gondoliers.

In 1937, Drummond-Grant became one of D'Oyly Carte's principal sopranos. She began the season as the Plaintiff, Josephine, Patience, Phyllis in Iolanthe (sharing the role), the title role in Princess Ida and Elsie Maynard in The Yeomen of the Guard. She was selected to play Aline when The Sorcerer was revived in 1938. She won excellent reviews for her performances. Of her Ida, The Manchester Guardian wrote, "Miss Ann Drummond-Grant sang and acted the heroine's part as finely as any of her predecessors that we can remember." The paper also praised her as Patience and Elsie. However, the company was hiring new sopranos, including Helen Roberts, and Drummond-Grant lost roles or had to share them. The Times later wrote, "Being strikingly tall and well-built, she was judged to be not quite fitted for the leading soprano parts." By this time, also, Drummond-Grant was having a romantic relationship with her future husband, the D'Oyly Carte musical director, Isidore Godfrey, who was married; the company's management feared a scandal. She left the company at the end of 1938.

Drummond-Grant married Godfrey in 1940. She played throughout the 1940s in non-musical theatre pieces, operettas (notably Waltzes from Vienna with Thomas Round), pantomime and summer shows.

=== Return as principal contralto ===
In 1950, she returned to the D'Oyly Carte company, at first as a contralto chorister and understudy to the principal contralto Ella Halman. She deputised on occasion as Dame Carruthers in Yeomen and the Duchess of Plaza-Toro in The Gondoliers. In 1951, when Halman left the company, Drummond-Grant became the D'Oyly Carte principal contralto for the next seven and a half years, playing Little Buttercup in Pinafore, Ruth in The Pirates of Penzance, Lady Jane in Patience, the Queen of the Fairies in Iolanthe, Lady Blanche in Princess Ida (starting in 1955), Katisha in The Mikado, Dame Hannah in Ruddigore, Dame Carruthers and the Duchess.

Drummond-Grant was less extrovert than some of her predecessors, and Kenneth Sandford, as a young newcomer to the company, was daunted by her "dowager austerity". In general, however, she was seen as "a most likeable and kindly artist" and was something of a mother-figure to the company. She was known to her D'Oyly Carte colleagues as "Drummie", though her husband was always particular about addressing her as "Miss Grant" when in the theatre. Her D'Oyly Carte colleague, the veteran Darrell Fancourt, called her, "one of the very few people who have sung the contralto parts … not as hard, beastly women, but with a true understanding of their light and shade." Of one of her last appearances, The Guardian wrote, "Lady Blanche [was] majestically portrayed last night by Ann Drummond-Grant, in whose hands tradition is always safe."

Drummond-Grant developed breast cancer by mid-1956 but continued to perform. In September 1958 she was hospitalised, but she returned to performing in December. She gave her last performance on 23 May 1959, in Bournemouth, and died less than four months later in London, at the age of 54.

== Recordings ==
There are no known recordings of Drummond-Grant in her soprano roles (she can, however, be heard singing "Coming Through the Rye" as a soprano). In the early 1950s, she recorded several of the principal mezzo-soprano roles from the Gilbert and Sullivan operas, although she never played them on stage. These were Mad Margaret in Ruddigore (1950), Phoebe Meryll in Yeomen (1950), Iolanthe (1951), and Lady Saphir in Patience (1951). Of her contralto roles, she recorded Lady Blanche (1955), Katisha (1957) and Ruth (1957). She was Lady Sangazure in the 1953 recording of The Sorcerer, a role she never played on stage, as the opera was not in the D'Oyly Carte repertory at the time. She played most of the contralto roles in BBC radio broadcasts with D'Oyly Carte between 1953 and 1959.
