= Grahame Clifford =

British opera singer and actor

Clifford as the Duke of Plaza-Toro in The Gondoliers, 1941

Grahame Clifford (25 December 1905 – 26 January 1984), was an English singer and actor, known for comic parts in the Gilbert and Sullivan operas and in character roles for the Royal Opera Company, Covent Garden.

In his early career Clifford played a wide range of roles in operas by composers from Handel to Vaughan Williams. He also acted in plays, produced theatre and taught. From 1939 to 1946 he was principal comedian of the D'Oyly Carte Opera Company playing the comic leads in Gilbert and Sullivan's Savoy operas.

After the war Clifford was a founding member of the Covent Garden Opera Company with which he played character roles in the German, French and Italian repertoire. In the last decades of his life he lived in New Zealand, where he performed, taught and directed until his retirement in 1981.

== Life and career ==
=== Early years ===
Clifford was born Clifford White in Burnley, Lancashire. He attended the Royal Manchester College of Music from 1925 to 1928, winning the Stocks Massey Scholarship and appeared in The Marriage of Figaro at the college in 1928. From 1928 to 1930, he studied at the Royal College of Music in London under a scholarship endowed by Ernest Palmer. Still appearing under his original name, he created the role of Frank Ford in Vaughan Williams's opera Sir John in Love in a college production in which his fellow-student Richard Watson played Falstaff. By the following year Clifford had adopted his stage name, under which he again appeared as Master Ford in an Oxford Festival production of Sir John in Love, conducted, as the premiere had been, by Malcolm Sargent.

Clifford's first professional London performance was in Handel's opera Giulio Cesare in 1930, in a production arranged and conducted by Gervase Hughes. In 1933 he played Constable in Vaughan Williams's Hugh the Drover, conducted by Sir Thomas Beecham. During the early 1930s he toured with the Carl Rosa Opera Company, with whom his roles included Tonio in Pagliacci, Alberich in Der Ring des Nibelungen, Dr. Miracle in The Tales of Hoffmann and the title part in Rigoletto, in which the anonymous critic in The Observer judged that he sang well but slightly over-acted.

For several years in the 1930s Clifford left singing to teach and act in plays and to produce plays and operas at the Westminster Theatre. In 1937, he returned to opera, joining the Covent Garden company for the annual seasons at the Royal Opera House as principal baritone. He made his television debut in 1938 as King Claudius in W. S. Gilbert's play Rosencrantz and Guildenstern.

=== D'Oyly Carte Opera Company ===
In September 1939, at the outbreak of the Second World War, the British government ordered all theatres to close indefinitely. Rupert D'Oyly Carte cancelled the D'Oyly Carte Opera Company's entire autumn tour and terminated the contracts of all of his performers. When the company started up again at Christmas 1939, Carte's principal comedian, Martyn Green, had accepted another engagement and was not available. At Richard Watson's suggestion Clifford auditioned for the vacancy and was engaged to play Green's roles in the Gilbert and Sullivan operas, which were produced in repertory by the company. He was coached by the company's director, J. M. Gordon, who had worked with W.S. Gilbert, but Carte encouraged Clifford to recreate all his characters afresh. The Times said of his performance in The Yeomen of the Guard, "the final moments in which the heartbroken merryman struggles to hide his grief are played with real beauty. Mr Clifford makes no attempt to imitate his predecessors in the part, and his performance gains immensely as a result." The Times critic, who had seen the original cast of The Mikado, considered Clifford "second to none" as Ko-Ko.

From 1939 to 1946, Clifford performed with the D'Oyly Carte company nearly year-round. His eight roles were: Sir Joseph Porter in H.M.S. Pinafore, Major-General Stanley in The Pirates of Penzance, Bunthorne in Patience, the Lord Chancellor in Iolanthe, Ko-Ko in The Mikado, Robin Oakapple in Ruddigore, Jack Point in The Yeomen of the Guard, and the Duke of Plaza-Toro in The Gondoliers.

=== Covent Garden and later years ===
After leaving D'Oyly Carte in August 1946, Clifford appeared in a new production of the comic opera Merrie England, before becoming a founder-member of the new Royal Opera company at the Royal Opera House, Covent Garden. In the inaugural production, Carmen, in January 1947, he played Dancairo. In the Italian repertory he played Benoit in La bohème and Ping in Turandot. In German operas he ranged from Faninal in Der Rosenkavalier and Beckmesser in Die Meistersinger to Alberich in Der Ring des Nibelungen, alongside guest singers including Kirsten Flagstad, Hans Hotter and Set Svanholm. At the first Covent Garden performances of Peter Grimes he played Ned Keene. In 1950 Clifford recorded the roles of Spalanzani and Frantz in a recording of The Tales of Hoffmann conducted by Beecham, which later formed the soundtrack of the 1951 film version. In 1952 he appeared in a BBC television production of Pagliacci, in the role of Tonio. in 1953, the year of Queen Elizabeth II's coronation, he appeared as Walter Winkins in Merrie England in an outdoor production at Luton Hoo house, with nearly 1,000 performers.

From 1953–54 Clifford returned to the Royal Manchester College of Music to teach and to help create a school of opera. For the next two years, he taught privately and performed and directed in London. In 1956 he joined the J. C. Williamson Gilbert and Sullivan Opera Company, succeeding Ivan Menzies as principal comedian, to tour in Australia and New Zealand. His co-stars included his old friend Richard Watson, Muriel Brunskill, Helen Roberts and Richard Walker. He moved in 1958 to Dunedin, New Zealand, where he directed a number of theatre and opera companies until 1964, including the Dunedin Repertory Company, Dunedin Opera Company, Shakespeare Company, and Oamaru Operatic Company. He also taught privately from 1963–65.

In the 1960s Clifford toured with the New Zealand Opera Company in roles such as Frosch in Die Fledermaus, which he had first played at Covent Garden in the 1930s. He also continued to teach and direct. In 1976, he performed the role of King Gama in Princess Ida for the Dunedin Gilbert and Sullivan Company's 25th anniversary production. He made a TV film of Gianni Schicchi, in the role of Doctor Spinelloccio, in 1979, and retired in 1981.

Clifford died in Auckland, New Zealand, in 1984 at the age of 79.

== Recordings and films ==
Clifford appears in Sir Thomas Beecham's studio recording of The Tales of Hoffmann (1951) and his live Covent Garden The Bartered Bride (1939).

Clifford also appeared in a 1938 television production of W. S. Gilbert's Rosencrantz and Guildenstern as King Claudius. In 1952 he appeared in a BBC television production of Pagliacci, in the role of Tonio.
