= Julia Goss =

Scottish singer

Julia Goss (c. 1946 – 5 August 2023), was a Scottish singer and actress best known for her performances in the principal soprano roles of the Gilbert and Sullivan operas with the D'Oyly Carte Opera Company. She joined that company in 1967, remaining with them until 1979.

Goss then performed in opera with the Old Vic Theatre Company for a season, singing the roles of Micaëla in Carmen, the Countess in The Marriage of Figaro, Norina in Don Pasquale, and Marguerite in Gounod's Faust. Following this, she began a career in London's West End and on tour in many musicals, including in the roles of Golde in Fiddler on the Roof, Carlotta in Phantom of the Opera, Mrs. Potts in Beauty and the Beast and Heidi Schiller in Follies. She also performed in concerts and in her own cabaret act.

== Early years and D'Oyly Carte ==
Goss was born in Baillieston, Lanarkshire, near Glasgow, Scotland, of Scots ancestry. Her family moved to London when she was very young, and she participated in plays and musicals in school, also singing in church and in local choirs. She studied music at Trinity College of Music in London, performing in concerts and operas while a student. During her last year of music school, in the spring of 1967, Goss joined the D'Oyly Carte Opera Company as a chorister. She was stopped in the middle of her audition piece and feared that she had failed the audition, but the audition panel had heard enough to hire her on the spot. In the autumn of 1968, she began to play smaller principal roles in the Gilbert and Sullivan operas with the company, including Isabel in The Pirates of Penzance, Sacharissa in Princess Ida, Kate in The Yeomen of the Guard (also understudying and occasionally performing the leading role of Elsie Maynard), and Giulia in The Gondoliers.

When Valerie Masterson left the company at the beginning of 1969, Goss took over her leading soprano roles. These included Mabel in Pirates, Yum-Yum in The Mikado, Elsie in Yeomen (although she only played this role in 1969), Casilda in The Gondoliers, Lady Ella in Patience, Lady Psyche in Princess Ida, Rose Maybud in Ruddigore and Aline in The Sorcerer. She also occasionally played Josephine in H.M.S. Pinafore. In 1975, during the company's centenary season, she played the Plaintiff in Trial by Jury, Princess Nekaya in Utopia Limited, and Julia Jellicoe in the concert performance of The Grand Duke. Colleague Jeffrey Cresswell related Goss's comment, after a man died in the audience during a performance of The Mikado at the New Wimbledon Theatre: "I know matinees can sometimes be a little lacklustre, but Julia said she didn't think we had been that bad!"

Both during and after her years in the D'Oyly Carte Opera Company, Goss performed in oratorios and other concerts. In March 1970, she was soprano soloist in a performance of Bach's St. John Passion at the Queen Elizabeth Hall.

== Later career ==
After Goss left the D'Oyly Carte organisation in 1979, she performed in opera with the Old Vic Theatre Company for a season, singing the roles of Micaela in Carmen, the Countess in The Marriage of Figaro, Norina in Don Pasquale, and Marguerite in Gounod's Faust. At the Old Vic, she also appeared in Miss in Her Teens, and The Padlock. Following her opera season, she began a career in London's West End and on tour in many musicals, including in the roles of Josepha in The White Horse Inn, Golde in Fiddler on the Roof, Madame Dubonnet in The Boy Friend, Carlotta in Phantom of the Opera (1991–1992), Mrs. Potts in Beauty and the Beast, Molina's mother in Kiss of the Spider Woman, Baroness Elsa Schräder in The Sound of Music, Mrs. Nordstrom in A Little Night Music (2001) and Heidi Schiller in Follies (2002; in which Variety singled Goss out for praise, calling her singing of "One More Kiss" "shivery"). Goss also appeared in television and on radio and in her own cabaret act (sometimes called We Can Make It), in Monte Carlo, on cruise ships and on tour.

Goss performed with the Gilbert and Sullivan groups "The Magic of Gilbert and Sullivan", along with former D'Oyly Carte colleagues John Ayldon, Lorraine Daniels, Patricia Leonard, Kenneth Sandford and Geoffrey Shovelton, and "The Gilbert & Sullivan Companions", together with Shovelton, Jon Ellison, Jane Metcalf and Michael Rayner. She also performed with Opera della Luna as Little Buttercup in H.M.S. Pinafore. She attended several reunions of former D'Oyly Carte artists and appeared at the International Gilbert and Sullivan Festival in Buxton, England. Goss enjoyed travel, reading, cooking and needle-work.

In 1994, she guest starred on an episode of the television series ChuckleVision, called "Gala Performance", where she played a famous opera singer.

Goss died in England on 5 August 2023.

== Recordings ==
Among Goss's recordings are a number of Gilbert and Sullivan operas with the D'Oyly Carte Opera Company, including the roles of Plaintiff in Trial (1975), Nekaya in Utopia (1976), Julia in The Grand Duke (1976), Casilda in The Gondoliers (1977), and Laetitia Grinder in The Zoo (1978), and excerpts from The Gondoliers and Ruddigore in a 1970 recording with the company called "Songs and Snatches".
