= Helen Gilliland =

Northern Irish actress and singer (1897–1942)

Helen Gilliland (31 January 1897 – 24 November 1942) was a Northern Irish actress and singer. She sang leading soprano roles in Gilbert and Sullivan operas for the D'Oyly Carte Opera Company between 1917 and 1922, and other musical comedy roles in the 1920s and 1930s. She drowned after the ship on which was travelling was torpedoed by the Imperial Japanese Navy.

== Life ==
Gilliland (Phyllis), Nellie Briercliffe (Iolanthe) and Sydney Granville (Strephon), 1919

Gilliland was born in Belfast, Northern Ireland to John Gilliland, an official at Northern Bank. She studied at Victoria College in Belfast and the Royal College of Music in London.

She made her stage debut in July 1917, as a principal soprano on tour with the D'Oyly Carte Opera Company. She sang the leading roles of Aline in The Sorcerer, Mabel in The Pirates of Penzance, Phyllis in Iolanthe, Yum-Yum in The Mikado, and Casilda in The Gondoliers. Gilliland left D'Oyly Carte in June 1919. She returned in September 1919 to perform the same roles (with the exception of Mabel) for the company's 18-week London season at the Princes Theatre, which ran until January 1920. From October 1921 until April 1922 she returned to D'Oyly Carte for a final London season, appearing as Patience in Patience, Phyllis, Yum-Yum, Elsie Maynard in The Yeomen of the Guard, and Casilda.

In April 1922 Gilliland moved to the London Hippodrome and then other London theatres, where she took a variety of stage roles in musical comedies and operettas, including Round in 50 (1922), The Cousin from Nowhere (1923), Katinka (1923), Stop Flirting by Frederick J. Jackson (1923), Lilac Time (1924), Castles in the Air (1927), Princess Charming (1927) and Lady Mary (1928), written for her by Frederick Lonsdale. In 1928 she toured the United States, acting in The Red Robe by Stanley J. Weyman at the Shubert Theatre in New York City, and in other pieces such as Bitter Sweet, Balalaika and Carl Brisson's revival of The Merry Widow.

On her return to England, Gilliland appeared in The Song of the Drum at Drury Lane in January 1931, and in Nina Rosa at the Gaiety Theatre in August 1931. Over the next six years she performed in musical comedy, variety and pantomime roles, including Brisson's The Merry Widow. Gilliland's agent unsuccessfully tried to find a New York role for her in Oscar Hammerstein's 1938 musical about Gilbert and Sullivan, Knights of Song. She had only a single film appearance, in The Storm (1938).

During the Second World War Gilliland was a member of the Entertainments National Service Association (ENSA), performing to British troops. After completing a tour of India, she was travelling to an ENSA engagement in Africa in November 1942, when her ship was torpedoed by the Japanese Navy. The ship was sunk without survivors.
