= Leslie Rands =

British opera singer and actor

Leslie Rands (7 January 1900 – 6 December 1972) was an English opera singer and actor, best known for his performances in baritone roles of the Savoy Operas with the D'Oyly Carte Opera Company. He married D'Oyly Carte soprano Marjorie Eyre in 1926.

== Life and career ==
Leslie Rands was born in Chichester, England. He performed in the Chichester Cathedral choir and studied at the Royal School of Music before joining the D'Oyly Carte touring company in 1925 as a chorister. In 1926 he played Cox in Cox and Box, Samuel in The Pirates of Penzance, Sir Richard Cholmondeley, the Lieutenant of the Tower, in The Yeomen of the Guard, and Giuseppe (or, occasionally, Luiz) in The Gondoliers. In 1927, he added the role of Pish-Tush in The Mikado to his repertoire.

Beginning in 1928 Rands played the principal baritone parts of Counsel to the Plaintiff and later the Learned Judge in Trial by Jury, Doctor Daly in The Sorcerer, Captain Corcoran in H.M.S. Pinafore, occasionally the Pirate king in Pirates, Archibald Grosvenor (and occasionally Colonel) in Patience, Strephon in Iolanthe, Florian in Princess Ida, Pish-Tush, Cholmondeley and Giuseppe.

Leslie Rands left the D'Oyly Carte company in 1947, but in 1949, he and his wife joined former D'Oyly Carters Richard Walker, Helen Roberts, John Dean, and others for a tour of Australia and New Zealand with the J. C. Williamson Gilbert and Sullivan Opera Company, where he appeared as Mountararat and the Mikado. Upon his return to England, he was reunited with his former colleagues to sing Captain Corcoran and the Counsel for the Plaintiff on the Company's 1949 Decca LP recordings of Pinafore and Trial.

In 1952, Rands and Eyre played the Earl of Essex and Jill-All-Alone in a week's run of Merrie England for charity in Priory Park, Chichester. Later, he directed amateur Gilbert and Sullivan societies.

Rands died in Chichester, England.

== Recordings ==
His recordings with D'Oyly Carte included Strephon (1929 Iolanthe), Grosvenor (1930 Patience), Giuseppe (1931 Gondoliers excerpts), Doctor Daly (1933 abridged Sorcerer), Pish-Tush (1936 Mikado), Corcoran in (1949 Pinafore) and Counsel in (1949 Trial).

== See also ==
- J. C. Williamson
