= L. Radley Flynn =

British singer and actor

L. Radley "Rad" Flynn (June 14, 1902 – March 9, 1978) was an English singer and actor, best known for his performances in bass roles of the Savoy Operas with the D'Oyly Carte Opera Company from 1928 to 1951. He married D'Oyly Carte contralto Ella Halman in 1940. In 1951, the Flynns toured in America and continued to play in Gilbert and Sullivan operas with Martyn Green. They retired to England where they retired to Penrith and were involved with amateur operatic societies. Flynn recorded five of his D'Oyly Carte roles.

== Life and career ==
Radley Flynn was born in Rochdale, Lancashire. He joined the D'Oyly Carte Opera Company in 1928 and was initially assigned the small role of Giorgio in The Gondoliers. The following year, he added the roles of Go-To in The Mikado, the Carpenter's Mate in H.M.S. Pinafore, and Scynthius in Princess Ida. In 1931, Flynn added the role of Old Adam Goodheart in Ruddigore and had the opportunity to substitute for Sydney Granville as Private Willis in Iolanthe.

Flynn left the company in 1933 to perform in music hall, returning in 1934 to play the same roles. During the next five years, he continued playing these small roles and sometimes substituted as Private Willis, Pirate King in The Pirates of Penzance, the title role in The Mikado, and Sir Roderic in Ruddigore. In 1941, he took over Willis from Granville and the Usher in Trial by Jury from Richard Walker.

In 1946, Flynn gave up Private Willis and temporarily traded the Usher for the Foreman of the Jury. When Walker left the company in 1948, Flynn reacquired the Usher and played the Lieutenant of the Tower in The Yeomen of the Guard occasionally. Flynn also substituted for Darrell Fancourt on numerous occasions between 1946 and 1951 as the Pirate King, Dick Deadeye in H.M.S. Pinafore, the Mikado, Sir Roderic, and Sergeant Meryll in Yeomen.

After 23 years with the D'Oyly Carte organisation, Flynn left in 1951, moving to America where he and Ella Halman toured with Martyn Green in a series of Gilbert and Sullivan productions presented by S. M. Chartock. His roles on this 1952 tour included the Usher, the Carpenter's Mate, and Go-To. The Flynns lived in America for a time before returning to England where they settled in Penrith and were involved with amateur operatic societies, founding the Penrith Savoyards in 1959. In 1975, during the D'Oyly Carte Opera Company's centennial season, the Flynns were invited to participate in the final performance of Trial by Jury, in which the regular D'Oyly Carte chorus was augmented by fourteen former stars of the company. The Flynns maintained a lifelong friendship with former D'Oyly Carte tenor, John Dean.

Flynn died while fishing in the River Eden, in Cumbria.

== Recordings ==
Flynn's roles recorded with D'Oyly Carte included Go-To in The Mikado (1936 and 1950), the Carpenter's Mate in Pinafore (1949), the Usher in Trial (1949), Giorgio in The Gondoliers (1950), and Old Adam in Ruddigore (1950). He also appeared on the radio as the Mikado in a 1951 BBC broadcast.
