= Nellie Briercliffe =

English singer and actress (1889–1966)

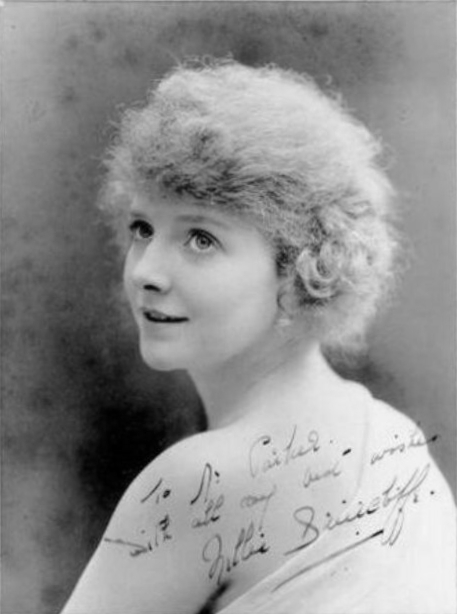
Briercliffe, circa 1915

Nellie Briercliffe (24 April 1889 – 12 December 1966) was an English singer and actress best known for her performances in the mezzo-soprano roles of the Savoy Operas with the D'Oyly Carte Opera Company.

After playing in the provinces early in her career, Briercliffe joined the D'Oyly Carte in 1914, touring for over three years in the Gilbert and Sullivan soubrette roles. She left the company to play in London's the West End, but rejoined D'Oyly Carte for their 1919–20 London season. After this, she played on the West End in musicals and comic plays, with a three-year hiatus from 1924 to 1927, until she finally retired in 1931. She recorded seven of her D'Oyly Carte roles.

== Life and career ==
Briercliffe was born in 1889 in Bolton, the daughter of Robert Briercliffe, a solicitor, and his wife Rachael (née Ashton). She had an older brother, Norman (1887–1925). Nellie Briercliffe performed extensively in the British provinces before making her debut in London. In December 1913, she appeared at the Haymarket Theatre in a curtain-raiser, A Dear Little Wife. She also sang in the concert hall.

She joined the D'Oyly Carte Opera Company in October 1914 after Rupert D'Oyly Carte saw her performance at the Haymarket and "was much struck by her vivacity". She was cast immediately in the principal soubrette roles of the Gilbert and Sullivan operas as follows: Hebe in H.M.S. Pinafore, Edith in The Pirates of Penzance, Angela in Patience, Iolanthe in Iolanthe, Melissa in Princess Ida, Pitti-Sing in The Mikado, Phoebe in The Yeomen of the Guard and Tessa in The Gondoliers. When The Sorcerer was revived in 1916, she added the role of Constance. Briercliffe "quickly established herself as a favorite with London audiences" and toured constantly with the company for more than three years.

Briercliffe left the D'Oyly Carte company in January 1918 and appeared in London in the musical comedy Pamela, at the Palace Theatre with Lily Elsie and Owen Nares. She then took over the role of Joy Chatterton in the long-running musical The Boy at the Adelphi Theatre. She rejoined D'Oyly Carte for the 1919–20 London season, when the company returned to London for the first time in a decade, at the Prince's Theatre, playing all her former roles. In 1920 she returned to musical comedy in London, appearing with Jack Buchanan in Wild Geese by Ronald Jeans and Charles Cuvillier; as Dulcenea in Oh! Julie, composed by H. Sullivan Brooke and Herman Darewski, at the Shaftesbury Theatre; and as the Shepherdess in the children's play, The Shepherdess Without a Heart at the Garrick Theatre, of which The Times wrote, "Many a young heart must have been lost yesterday afternoon to Miss Nellie Briercliffe. … She looked delightful, she sang sweetly, and she acted so prettily that there was a general sigh of regret when she became a china figure once again."

In September 1921, she married Major Thirlwall George Philipson (1897–1952). They had one son, John Thirlwall Philipson (1922–1965). In 1924 she starred in a "fantastic ballad opera", Kate; or, Love Will Find Out the Way, after which she took a three-year break from the stage. She filed for divorce from her husband in 1926 and returned to the West End in January 1927 in John Galsworthy's drama, Escape, and in the same year succeeded her sister-in-law, Mabel Russell Philipson, as Blanquette in The Beloved Vagabond, at the New Theatre. In 1928 she appeared in Christabel Marillier's musical version of The Rose and the Ring, conducted by Malcolm Sargent.

Helen Gilliland (Phyllis), Briercliffe (Iolanthe) and Sydney Granville (Strephon), 1919

Briercliffe joined D'Oyly Carte a third and last time for the 22-week 1929–30 season at the newly rebuilt Savoy Theatre. Of her previous roles, she reprised Angela, Iolanthe, Melissa, Pitti-Sing, Phoebe and Tessa, and added a new role, Mad Margaret in Ruddigore. After the season ended, she appeared in Fountain of Youth, "an amusing comic opera of country life," by W. Graham Robertson with music by Alfred Reynolds at the Lyric Theatre, Hammersmith, and finally in a non-musical costume drama, The Immortal Lady by Clifford Bax in 1931.

Briercliffe, known in the D'Oyly Carte company as "Budgie", was popular with audiences for her vivacious stage presence. One writer noted:

[F]or the older members like myself who saw them all in person there was nobody to come up to Nellie Briercliffe. In my opinion she had everything. Her stage presence was superb: dainty, petite and with a kind of fairy grace which you could never forget. Certainly there never has or will be another Iolanthe like her. ... I can still see her in the supplication song, standing in the dim light and that glorious voice full of the pathos which tended to bring tears to your eyes. It was indeed a splendid voice, lovely and mellow and you sometimes wondered where all the power came from her slight frame. And yet she also had an impish sense of humour ... as Tessa, as Melissa in Ida (the best I have ever seen). What humour she extracted from this part and also from Phoebe ... this sense of humour was something which to me made her stand out above the others.

Briercliffe died in Portsmouth in 1966, aged 77.

== Recordings ==
Briercliffe participated in all seven D'Oyly Carte recordings made for His Master's Voice between 1929 and 1932, as Phoebe, Edith, Iolanthe, Hebe, Angela, Margaret and Melissa.
