= Geoffrey Shovelton =

English singer, actor and illustrator (1936–2016)

Shovelton (right) as Tolloller in Iolanthe, with John Reed as the Lord Chancellor

Geoffrey Richard Shovelton (27 April 1936 – 4 July 2016) was an English singer, actor and illustrator best known for his performances in leading tenor roles with the D'Oyly Carte Opera Company in the 1970s.

Shovelton began his professional life with a teaching career, during which he began to perform professionally in oratorio and opera. He became a full-time professional singer in 1971, performing with Scottish Opera and other companies. Shovelton joined the D'Oyly Carte Opera Company in 1975, playing the leading tenor roles in the Gilbert and Sullivan operas until the company closed in 1982. He also made a few recordings with the company.

He continued to perform in Savoy operas, other operas and in concerts both in the UK and the US, and to organize tours and direct productions. Shovelton also illustrated books, journals, promotional materials and greeting cards, mostly in connection with Gilbert and Sullivan. He and his wife settled in the US, in Maine, in 2001, after which he continued to direct, until 2005, and to create artworks, write and give lectures until his last years.

== Life and career ==
Shovelton was born in Atherton, Lancashire, the only child of Kathleen and Richard Shovelton. He attended the Thornleigh Salesian College in Bolton and studied geography at the University of Hull. While at Hull, he met and married his first wife, Margaret, née Blanchard, a fellow geography student. He began a career in education, and for several years he was senior geography master at the Salvatorian College, a grammar school in Wealdstone, Middlesex, while pursuing post-graduate research at the University of London. Meanwhile, he played the piano and organ and studied voice with Dino Borgioli, Roy Henderson and Denis Dowling. While still teaching, Shovelton performed in amateur operatic productions and first played in a Gilbert and Sullivan opera in 1961 in The Pirates of Penzance. In 1964 and 1965 he received awards in singing competitions at 's-Hertogenbosch in the Netherlands and Verviers in Belgium, and these helped him to decide to pursue a career in opera.

=== Early career ===
Shovelton first sang professionally in oratorio, performing in such works as Handel's Messiah, Haydn's Creation, Mendelssohn's Elijah, and Verdi's Requiem, finally becoming a full-time singer in 1971. Early in his career he played principal roles with Nonesuch Opera, Chelsea Opera Group (Prince Andrey in three concert performances of Khovanshchina), Tayside Opera, Basilica Opera, Scottish Opera and its touring group, Opera for All. His roles included Roderigo in Verdi's Otello, Don Curzio in Mozart's The Marriage of Figaro, and Lysander in Benjamin Britten's A Midsummer Night's Dream. He returned to the Savoy Operas in 1973 with the touring companies Gilbert and Sullivan for All in the UK and The World of Gilbert & Sullivan in Australasia and the US.

Having joined the D'Oyly Carte Opera Company as principal tenor at the beginning of the 1975–76 season, Shovelton initially played Tolloller in Iolanthe, Nanki-Poo in The Mikado, Colonel Fairfax in The Yeomen of the Guard, and later that season added the roles of Luiz in The Gondoliers and the Duke of Dunstable in Patience. In 1977 he added to his repertoire the roles of Cyril in Princess Ida and Box in Cox and Box when those works were revived. He played the Defendant in a special performance of Trial by Jury in 1978 at London's Middle Temple Hall to commemorate the Bar Musical Society's first hundred concerts. In April 1979 he left D'Oyly Carte to tour with several other former D'Oyly Carte singers in a group that he founded, The Gilbert and Sullivan Companions, and he took other singing assignments. In 1980, he rejoined the D'Oyly Carte Opera Company, continuing with them until the company closed in February 1982. Shovelton recalled the "family spirit" of the company, writing that this was necessary in a year-round touring company where "singing takes me away from my wife and three young children for extended periods". Shovelton's first marriage was eventually annulled; the couple's children were Claire, Dominic and Bruno. During these years, he also appeared at the Birmingham Triennial Music Festival in 1977, among a few other concert appearances for various charities, also sometimes designing artwork for the benefits.

=== Later years ===
After the closure of the D'Oyly Carte Opera Company, Shovelton sang opera roles together with some old Scottish Opera colleagues, with piano accompaniment, in a wine bar, Il Boccalino and a restaurant, Terrazza-Est, both in London, including Rodolfo in La bohème. He also sang with the London Operetta Ensemble, presenting concerts of opera and lighter music in seaside venues in southern England. He continued to perform Gilbert and Sullivan: with the London Savoyards, he played Ralph Rackstraw in H.M.S. Pinafore, Frederic in The Pirates of Penzance and the Defendant in Trial by Jury. These were roles that he had not sung with D'Oyly Carte. He also sang in G&S concerts, with former D'Oyly Carte colleagues, in groups performing under the names Gilbert and Sullivan in Concert and The Magic of Gilbert and Sullivan. From 1984 to 2000, Shovelton frequently toured North America with, among others, Kenneth Sandford, John Ayldon and Lorraine Daniels, in a five-singer concert programme, created by Shovelton, called The Best of Gilbert and Sullivan. This group also performed on the radio and released three recordings of their repertoire. He also performed with a group of former D'Oyly Carte members called G&S a la carte. In the 1990s, he performed on occasion at the International Gilbert and Sullivan Festival in Buxton, England and with the Washington Savoyards in the US. In the 1980s and 1990s, he also entertained on several cruises and continued other concert work in Britain and Europe.

For many summers beginning in 1985, he performed in the productions of the Savoy Operas at the Gawsworth Hall Open Air Festival in Cheshire, In 1985, Shovelton met the American soprano and choreographer Deborah Clague (1949–2016) while singing together in La traviata at Il Boccalino, and the two married in England in 1993. Clague joined Shovelton in The Best of Gilbert and Sullivan touring group from 1993 to 2005. They also performed in concert as a duo, "The Two of Hearts", often in hospitals. With his wife, he directed numerous Gawsworth Hall productions from 1995. He also directed Gilbert and Sullivan operas for a number of amateur groups on both sides of the Atlantic. In 2001, the Shoveltons moved to New Portland, Maine, in the United States, where they continued their involvement in Gilbert and Sullivan by directing productions for the Hancock County Gilbert and Sullivan Society (2003–2006), among others. He continued to write and create artwork until his last years. Shovelton served, from 1990 until his death, as the Honorary President of the Gilbert and Sullivan Society of New York, where he gave the Jay Newman memorial lecture in 2014.

Shovelton died at the age of 80, at the Androscoggin Hospice in Auburn, Maine, only a month after his wife's death and the diagnosis of his brain tumour. The ashes of Shovelton and Clague rest at the Shovelton family burial site in Atherton.

=== Illustrations and cartoons ===
As an artist, Shovelton began with scraperboard and ink drawing and later turned to watercolour painting. He also became a skilled calligrapher. He designed posters, flyers and other artwork for the D'Oyly Carte Opera Company, including the programme cover for the company's last night at the Adelphi Theatre, as well as for all the Gawsworth Hall productions. He created the book covers and illustrated poem collections by his former tutor and friend, the geographer Jay Appleton. Shovelton's cartoons graced the monthly newsletter of the Gilbert and Sullivan Society of New York, The Palace Peeper, for over three decades. Shovelton also created numerous Gilbert and Sullivan themed Christmas, greeting and note cards, and was a keen photographer. He provided the cover illustration for a novel by Tony Joseph, The Diary of April March, and illustrated two books of poetry by his former tutor at Hull, Jay Appleton (Grains Among the Chaff and Enter the Fat Lady) and all three editions of Harry Benford's The Gilbert and Sullivan Lexicon (1978, 1991 and 1999).

== Recordings ==
With the D'Oyly Carte Opera Company, Shovelton recorded Luiz in The Gondoliers (1977), Box in Cox and Box (1978) and Fairfax in The Yeomen of the Guard (1979). In 1978 he narrated the Company's recording of The Zoo. He also appeared on recordings by The Best of Gilbert and Sullivan, a number of compilation albums and in a complete recording of the original French Don Carlos (Herald). Shovelton was a soloist in the concert video recording, "Gilbert & Sullivan Present their Greatest Hits," from Royal Albert Hall in 1983.
