= The Storm (1938 film) =

1938 film by Harold Young

- Theatrical release poster
- Directed by: Harold Young
- Screenplay by: Theodore Reeves; Daniel Moore; Hugh King
- Story by: Daniel Moore; Hugh King
- Produced by: Ken Goldsmith
- Starring: Charles Bickford; Barton MacLane; Preston Foster; Tom Brown; Nan Grey; Andy Devine; Frank Jenks; Samuel S. Hinds
- Cinematography: Milton Krasner
- Edited by: Frank Gross
- Production company: Universal Pictures
- Distributed by: Universal Pictures
- Release date: October 28, 1938
- Running time: 75 minutes
- Country: United States
- Language: English

The Storm is a 1938 American action film directed by Harold Young and written by Theodore Reeves, Daniel Moore and Hugh King. The film stars Charles Bickford, Barton MacLane, Preston Foster, Tom Brown, Nan Grey, Andy Devine, Frank Jenks and Samuel S. Hinds. The film was released on October 28, 1938, by Universal Pictures.

== Cast ==
- Charles Bickford as Bob Roberts
- Barton MacLane as Capt. Cogswell
- Preston Foster as Jack Stacey
- Tom Brown as Jim Roberts
- Nan Grey as Peggy Phillips
- Andy Devine as Swede Hanzen
- Frank Jenks as Peter Carey
- Samuel S. Hinds as Capt. Kenny
- Florence Roberts as Mrs. Roberts
- Jack Mulhall as Harry Blake
- Helen Gilliland as Hungry
- Mark Daniels as Cadet
- Joe Sawyer as Kelly
- Marion Martin as Jane
- Dorothy Arnold as Nora
