= Anna Bethell =

British actress and singer

Anna Bethell (1882 – 2 March 1969) was an English actress, singer and stage director. She is best known for her performances in the Gilbert and Sullivan operas with the D'Oyly Carte Opera Company. After playing other small mezzo-soprano parts, she played the role of Mrs. Partlett in The Sorcerer for many years. She also occasionally played some of the larger contralto roles. She later became stage director of the company from 1947 to 1949 and also directed the J. C. Williamson Gilbert and Sullivan Company.

Bethell was married to fellow D'Oyly Carte member Sydney Granville.

== Early years ==
Born in Lancashire, Bethell was engaged by the D'Oyly Carte Opera Company in 1909, singing in the chorus and playing the smaller mezzo-soprano roles of Kate in The Pirates of Penzance, Lady Saphir in Patience, Leila in Iolanthe and Chloe in Princess Ida. She later took on the role of Vittoria in The Gondoliers.

She left the company in 1912 but returned the next year, touring in the same roles and also as Peep-Bo in The Mikado. From 1915, Bethell sang in the chorus, again playing Saphir from 1917. In 1918, she began to understudy the principal contralto roles, then played by Bertha Lewis, and began to play Mrs. Partlett in The Sorcerer and Inez in The Gondoliers. Between 1918 and 1924, she also toured, from time to time, in two plays by Stanley Houghton, Hindle Wakes (as Fanny Hawthorn) and The Younger Generation. In 1921, she resumed the small part of Chloe, with D'Oyly Carte, and the next year also began again to play Kate. In 1923, she sometimes played the role of Cousin Hebe in H.M.S. Pinafore, Melissa in Princess Ida, Pitti-Sing in The Mikado, and Tessa in The Gondoliers. After this, until 1925, she played the parts of Mrs. Partlett, Chloe and Inez.

At the end of 1925, Bethel and her husband, Sydney Granville, and other company members left the D'Oyly Carte to travel to Australia, performing in Gilbert and Sullivan roles with the J. C. Williamson Ltd. company. In 1929, she rejoined D'Oyly Carte as Mrs Partlett, playing the role until 1939. In 1931, she occasionally played Little Buttercup in Pinafore and Dame Hannah in Ruddigore. Bethell is heard as Mrs Partlett on the D'Oyly Carte's 1933 recording of excerpts from The Sorcerer.

== Stage director ==
Bethell was engaged by the D'Oyly Carte Opera Company as Stage Director from 1947 to 1948. In his 1952 memoir, the former principal comedian of the company, Martyn Green, wrote: "During Anna Bethell's regime ... there had been growing signs of discontent and suggestions of favouritism being shown to some of the members of the chorus in respect to passing over existing understudies, selections for small parts, and so on." In 1949, she travelled to Australia to direct J. C. Williamson Ltd. productions of Gilbert and Sullivan. That company then toured these productions throughout Australasia for the next three years.

She died in 1969 in Bournemouth.
