= Ella Halman =

British opera singer and actress (1906–1995)

Ella Halman as Dame Hannah

Ella Louise Halman (July 18, 1906 – March 20, 1995) was an English opera singer and actress, best known for her performances in the contralto roles of the Savoy Operas with the D'Oyly Carte Opera Company. She married another D'Oyly Carte performer, L. Radley Flynn, in 1940.

Halman began her professional singing career on tour with the Carl Rosa Opera Company. After further experience in concert work and teaching, she joined the D'Oyly Carte Opera Company as a chorister in 1937. She soon was playing the role of Inez in The Gondoliers and understudying the larger contralto roles. From 1939 to 1951, she was the company's principal contralto. She and her husband then toured in Gilbert and Sullivan productions in America. They retired to Penrith, Cumbria, England, where they became involved with amateur operatic societies. She recorded eight of her roles with D'Oyly Carte.

== Life and career ==
Halman was born in Ealing, Middlesex. At age eighteen, Halman won the Sussex County Scholarship in singing, then studied for several years at the Brighton School of Music.

After touring for three years with the Carl Rosa Opera Company, she completed her studies in London. After some experience in concert work and teaching, she joined the D'Oyly Carte Opera Company as a chorister in 1937. Soon she assumed the role of Inez in The Gondoliers and, as understudy, began occasionally to play Katisha in The Mikado and the Duchess of Plaza-Toro in The Gondoliers. By 1939, she was also filling in as Ruth in The Pirates of Penzance and the Queen of the Fairies in Iolanthe.

On Christmas Day in 1939, Halman became the D'Oyly Carte principal contralto. For the next eleven years, she played Ruth in Pirates, Lady Jane in Patience, Queen of the Fairies in Iolanthe, Katisha in The Mikado, Dame Carruthers in The Yeomen of the Guard, the Duchess of Plaza Toro in The Gondoliers, Dame Hannah in Ruddigore, and Little Buttercup in H.M.S. Pinafore.

Halman and Flynn left the D'Oyly Carte organisation in 1951 and moved to America, where they toured, along with Martyn Green, in a series of Gilbert and Sullivan productions presented by S. M. Chartock. Halman's roles on the 1952 tour included Buttercup, Ruth, the Queen of the Fairies, and Katisha. The Flynns then returned to England, where they settled in Penrith, Cumbria in retirement but were involved with amateur operatic societies, principally the Penrith Savoyards from 1959. In 1975, during the D'Oyly Carte Opera Company's centennial season, Halman was invited to participate in the final performance of Trial by Jury, in which the regular D'Oyly Carte chorus was augmented by fourteen former stars of the company.

Halman recorded a series of interviews, regarding recollections of her life and career, in the early 1990s with BBC Radio Cumbria. She died in Penrith at the age of 88.

== Recordings ==
Her recordings with D'Oyly Carte, all between 1949 and 1951 when the company was taking advantage of the new LP technology, included Ruth in Pirates, Lady Jane in Patience, Queen of the Fairies in Iolanthe, Katisha in The Mikado, Dame Carruthers in Yeomen, the Duchess of Plaza Toro in The Gondoliers, Dame Hannah in Ruddigore, and Little Buttercup in Pinafore. She also sang Katisha in a 1951 BBC radio broadcast.

== Sources ==
- Ayre, Leslie (1972). The Gilbert & Sullivan Companion. London: W.H. Allen & Co Ltd. Introduction by Martyn Green.
