= The Gondoliers =

1889 comic opera by Gilbert & Sullivan

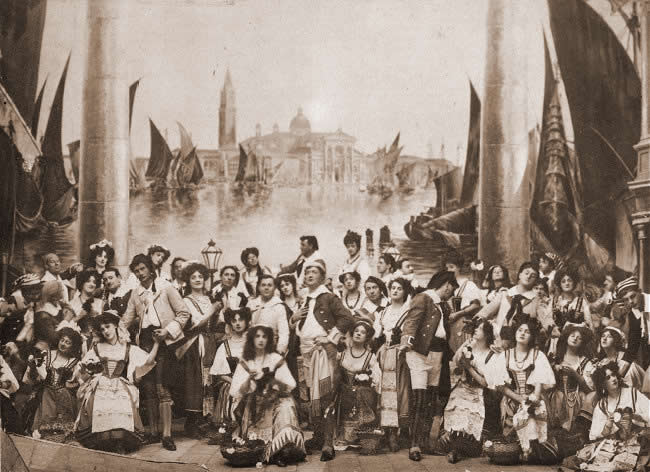
From Act I of the 1907 D'Oyly Carte production at the Savoy Theatre

The Gondoliers; or, The King of Barataria is a Savoy opera with music by Arthur Sullivan and libretto by W. S. Gilbert. It premiered at the Savoy Theatre on 7 December 1889 and ran for a very successful 554 performances (at that time the fifth longest-running piece of musical theatre in history), closing on 30 June 1891. This was the twelfth comic opera collaboration of fourteen between Gilbert and Sullivan.

The story of the opera concerns brothers Marco and Giuseppe Palmieri, a pair of Venetian gondoliers who are told that one of them is heir to the throne of the fictional kingdom of Barataria; until it can be discovered by the Grand Inquisitor which of them is the heir, they must rule jointly. Unbeknownst to the brothers, who have just married Venetian farm girls, the heir was wed in infancy to the daughter of the Spanish Duke of Plaza-Toro, who is herself in love with her father's servant. A subplot concerns the impoverished Duke attempting to improve his finances by forming a limited liability company.

The Gondoliers was Gilbert and Sullivan's last great success. In this opera, Gilbert returns to the satire of class distinctions figuring in many of his earlier librettos. The libretto also reflects Gilbert's fascination with the "Stock Company Act", highlighting what he saw as the absurd convergence of natural persons and legal entities, which plays an even larger part in the next opera, Utopia Limited. As in several of their earlier operas, by setting The Gondoliers comfortably far away from England, Gilbert was emboldened to direct sharper criticism at the nobility and the institution of the monarchy itself.

== Background ==
=== Genesis of the opera ===
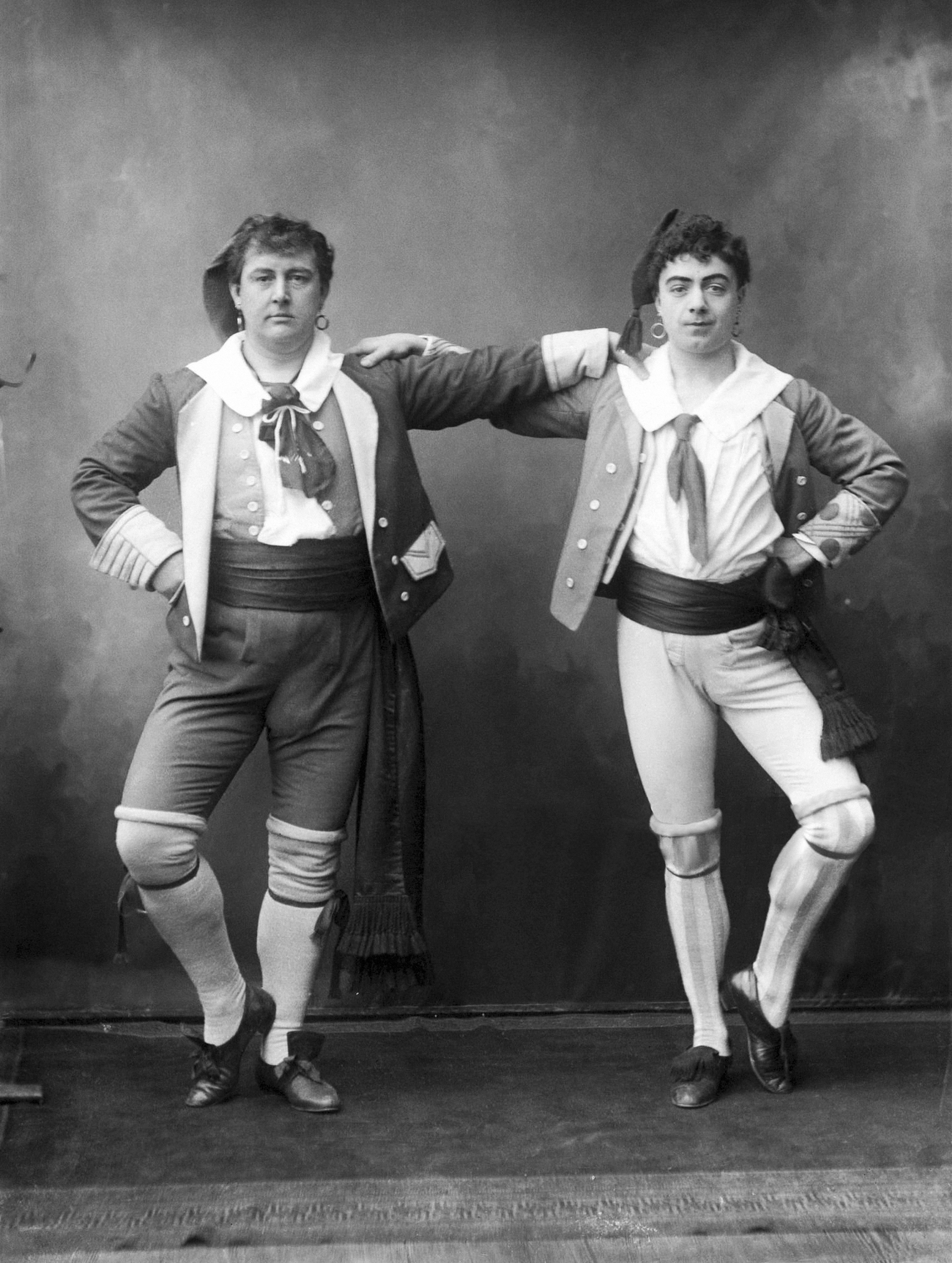
Barrington and Pounds as Giuseppe and Marco

The Gondoliers was preceded by the most serious of the Gilbert and Sullivan collaborations, The Yeomen of the Guard. On 9 January 1889, three months into that opera's fourteen-month run, Sullivan informed the librettist that he "wanted to do some dramatic work on a larger musical scale", that he "wished to get rid of the 'strongly marked rhythm', and 'rhymed' couplets, and have words that would have a chance of developing 'musical effects'." Gilbert counselled strongly that the partnership should continue on its former course:

I have thought carefully over your letter, and while I quite understand and sympathize with your desire to write what, for want of a better term, I suppose we must call 'grand opera,' I cannot believe that it would succeed either at the Savoy or at Carte's new theatre.... Moreover, to speak from my own selfish point of view, such an opera would afford me no chance of doing what I best do – the librettist of a grand opera is always swamped in the composer. Anybody – Hersee, Farnie, Reece – can write a good libretto for such a purpose; personally, I should be lost in it. Again, the success of the Yeoman [sic] – which is a step in the direction of serious opera – has not been so convincing as to warrant us in assuming that the public want something more earnest still.

On 12 March, Sullivan responded, "I have lost the liking for writing comic opera, and entertain very grave doubts as to my power of doing it.... You say that in a serious opera, you must more or less sacrifice yourself. I say that this is just what I have been doing in all our joint pieces, and, what is more, must continue to do in comic opera to make it successful."

A series of increasingly acrimonious letters followed over the ensuing weeks, with Sullivan laying down new terms for the collaboration, and Gilbert insisting that he had always bent over backwards to comply with the composer's musical requirements. Gilbert tried to encourage his collaborator:

You say that our operas are Gilbert's pieces with music added by you.... I say that when you deliberately assert that for 12 years you, incomparably the greatest English musician of the age – a man whose genius is a proverb wherever the English tongue is spoken – a man who can deal en prince with operatic managers, singers, music publishers and musical societies – when you, who hold this unparalleled position, deliberately state that you have submitted silently and uncomplainingly for 12 years to be extinguished, ignored, set aside, rebuffed, and generally effaced by your librettist, you grievously reflect, not upon him, but upon yourself and the noble art of which you are so eminent a professor.

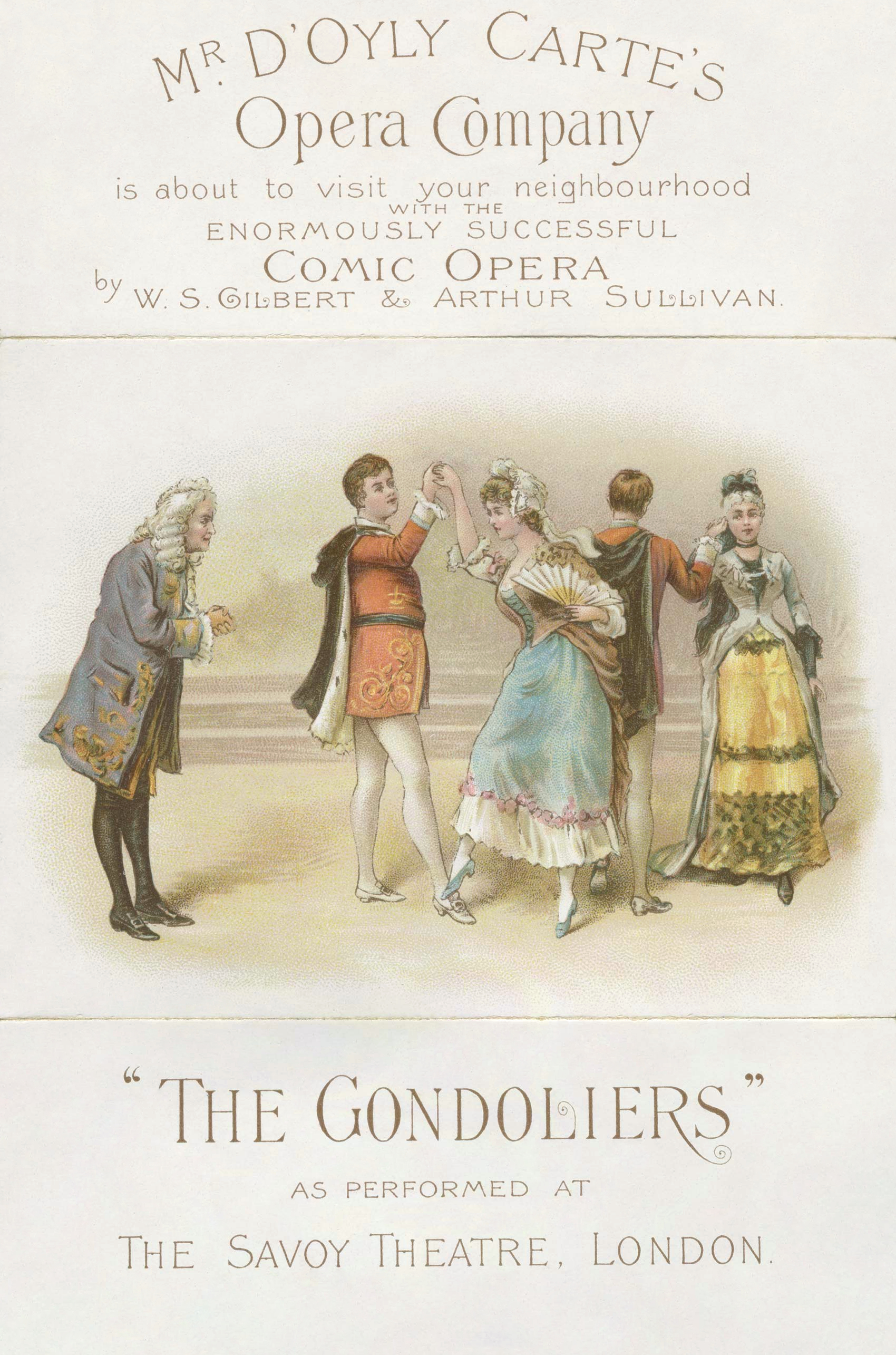
The gavotte scene: Circa 1890 advertisement for a touring company of the D'Oyly Carte Opera Company.

Gilbert offered a compromise that Sullivan ultimately accepted – that the composer would write a light opera for the Savoy, and a grand opera (Ivanhoe) for a new theatre that Carte was constructing for that purpose. Sullivan's acceptance came with the proviso that "we are thoroughly agreed upon the subject." Gilbert suggested an opera based on a theatrical company, which Sullivan rejected (though a version of it would be resurrected in 1896 as The Grand Duke), but he accepted an idea "connected with Venice and Venetian life, and this seemed to me to hold out great chances of bright colour and taking music. Can you not develop this with something we can both go into with warmth and enthusiasm and thus give me a subject in which (like The Mikado and Patience) we can both be interested....?"

Gilbert set to work on the new libretto by the early summer of 1889, and by the mid-summer Sullivan had started composing Act I. Gilbert provided Sullivan with alternative lyrics for many passages, allowing the composer to choose which ones he preferred. The long opening number (more than fifteen minutes of continuous music) was the librettist's idea, and it gave Sullivan the opportunity to establish the mood of the work through music. The costumes were designed by Percy Anderson and sets were by Hawes Craven, with choreography by Willie Warde. (Note: Savoy Theatre programme, The Gondoliers, 7 December 1889. The playbill states: "The dances arranged by Mr Warde (by permission of M. Marius)". At that time, Warde was appearing at the Avenue Theatre under contract to Marius. See The Era, 14 December 1889, p. 8.)

They worked all summer and autumn, with a successful opening on 7 December 1889. Press accounts were almost entirely favourable, and the opera enjoyed a run longer than any of their other joint works except for H.M.S. Pinafore, Patience and The Mikado. Sullivan's old collaborator on Cox and Box (and the editor of Punch), F. C. Burnand, wrote, "Magnificento! ... I envy you and W.S.G. being able to place a piece like this on the stage in so complete a fashion."

=== Reaction of the press and public ===
Leslie Baily notes, "The bubbling, champagne-quality of the libretto brought out the gayest Sullivan, and the Italian setting called up a warm, southern response from his own ancestry. The Graphic (14 December 1889) pointed out that the music contains not only an English idiom but 'the composer has borrowed from France the stately gavotte, from Spain the Andalusian cachucha, from Italy the saltarello and the tarantella, and from Venice itself the Venetian barcarolle'."

Of Gilbert's contribution, the Illustrated London News reported, "Mr. W. S. Gilbert has returned to the Gilbert of the past, and everyone is delighted. He is himself again. The Gilbert of The Bab Ballads, the Gilbert of whimsical conceit, inoffensive cynicism, subtle satire, and playful paradox; the Gilbert who invented a school of his own, who in it was schoolmaster and pupil, who has never taught anybody but himself, and is never likely to have any imitator – this is the Gilbert the public want to see, and this is the Gilbert who on Saturday night was cheered till the audience was weary of cheering any more."

There was a command performance of The Gondoliers for Queen Victoria and the royal family at Windsor Castle on 6 March 1891, the first performance of a Gilbert and Sullivan opera to be so honoured and the first theatrical entertainment to take place at Windsor since the death of Prince Albert thirty years earlier.

=== The Carpet Quarrel ===
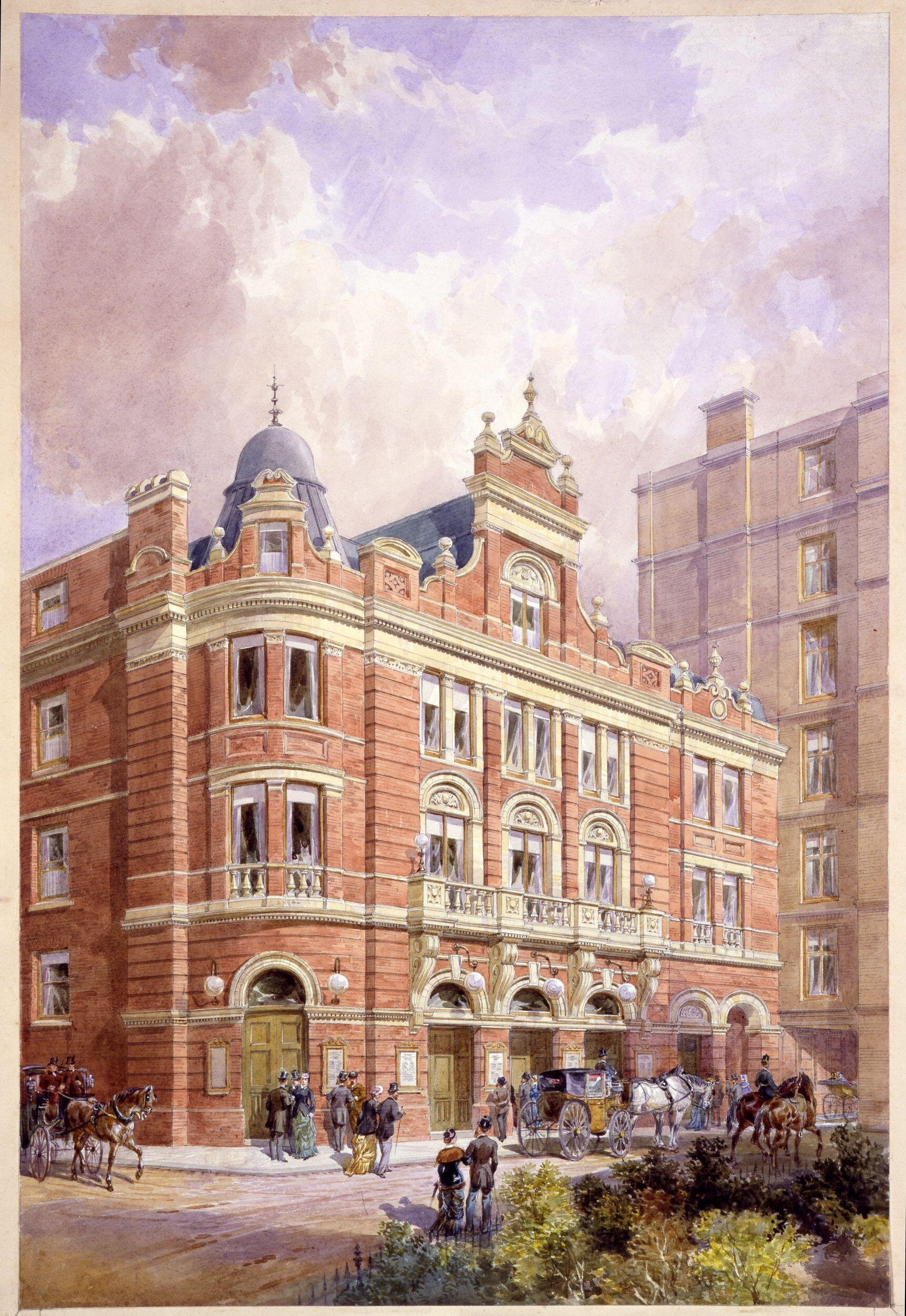
Savoy Theatre, 1881

With the exception of their first opera, Richard D'Oyly Carte produced every Gilbert and Sullivan opera and had built the Savoy Theatre specifically for productions of their shows. However, on several occasions during the 1880s the relationship among Gilbert, Sullivan and Carte had been strained.

In April 1890, during the run of The Gondoliers, Gilbert discovered that maintenance expenses for the theatre, including a new £500 (equivalent to £55,550 in 2025) carpet for the front lobby of the theatre, were being charged to the partnership instead of borne by Carte. Gilbert confronted Carte, but the producer refused to reconsider the accounts. Gilbert stormed out and wrote to Sullivan that "I left him with the remark that it was a mistake to kick down the ladder by which he had risen". Helen D'Oyly Carte wrote that Gilbert had addressed Carte "in a way that I should not have thought you would have used to an offending menial." As scholar Andrew Crowther has explained:

After all, the carpet was only one of a number of disputed items, and the real issue lay not in the mere money value of these things, but in whether Carte could be trusted with the financial affairs of Gilbert and Sullivan. Gilbert contended that Carte had at best made a series of serious blunders in the accounts, and at worst deliberately attempted to swindle the others. It is not easy to settle the rights and wrongs of the issue at this distance, but it does seem fairly clear that there was something very wrong with the accounts at this time. Gilbert wrote to Sullivan on 28 May 1891, a year after the end of the "Quarrel", that Carte had admitted "an unintentional overcharge of nearly £1,000 in the electric lighting accounts alone."

Things soon degraded, Gilbert lost his temper with his partners and brought a lawsuit against Carte. Sullivan supported Carte by making an affidavit erroneously stating that there were minor legal expenses outstanding from a battle Gilbert had in 1884 with Lillian Russell when, in fact, those expenses had already been paid. When Gilbert discovered this, he asked for a retraction of the affidavit; Sullivan refused. Gilbert felt betrayed. Sullivan felt that Gilbert was questioning his good faith, and Sullivan had other reasons to stay in Carte's good graces: Carte was building a new theatre, the Royal English Opera House (now the Palace Theatre), to produce Sullivan's only grand opera, Ivanhoe. After The Gondoliers closed in 1891, Gilbert withdrew the performance rights to his libretti, vowing to write no more operas for the Savoy.

Gilbert's aggressive, though successful, legal action had embittered Sullivan and Carte. But the partnership had been so profitable that Carte eventually sought to reunite the dramatist and composer. After many failed attempts by Carte and his wife, Gilbert and Sullivan reunited through the efforts of their music publisher, Tom Chappell. In 1893, they produced their penultimate collaboration, Utopia, Limited, but The Gondoliers would prove to be Gilbert and Sullivan's last big hit. Utopia was only a modest success, and their final collaboration, The Grand Duke, in 1896, was a failure. After that, the two never collaborated again.

== Roles ==
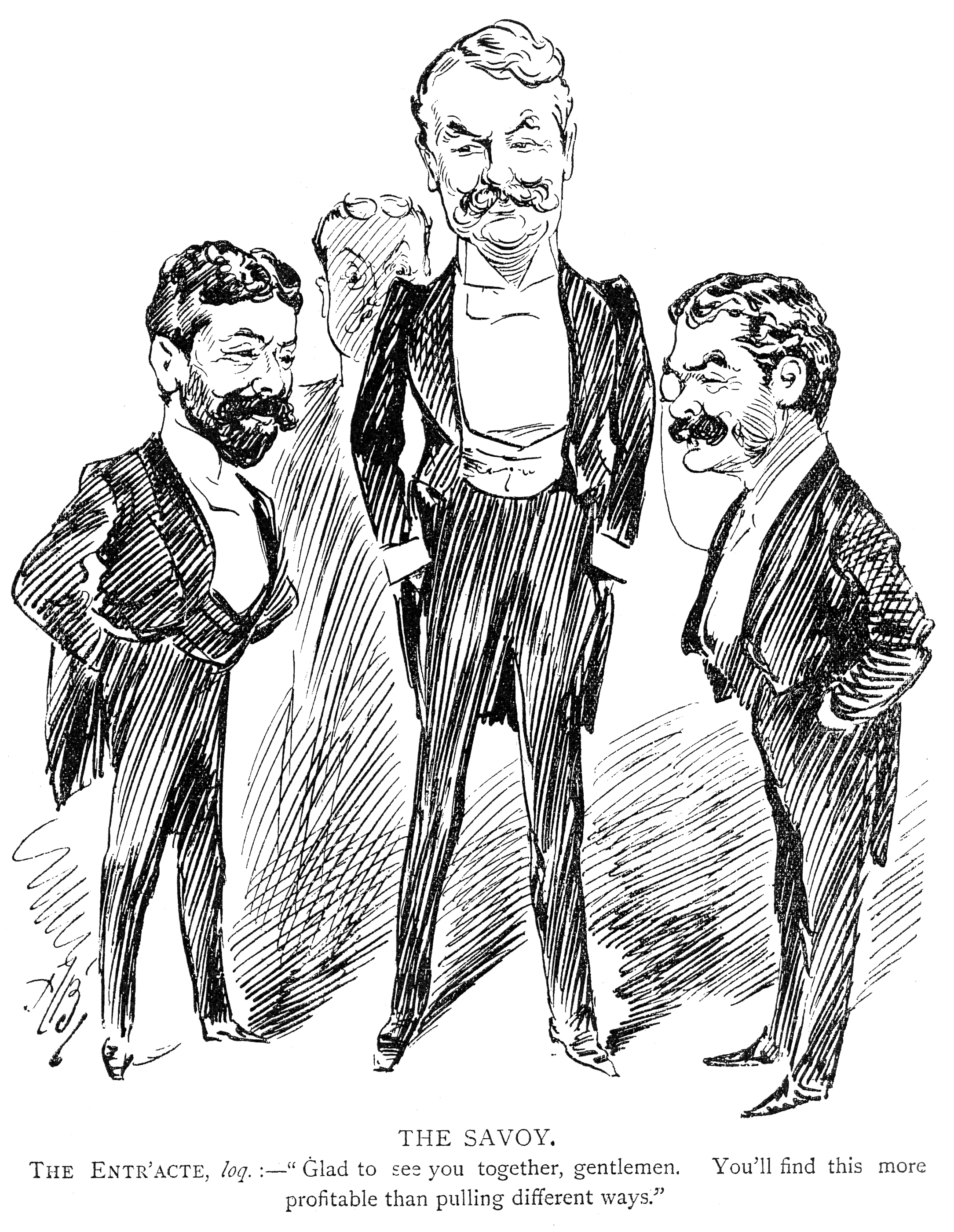
The Entr'acte expresses its pleasure that Gilbert and Sullivan are reunited.

- The Duke of Plaza-Toro, A Grandee of Spain (comic baritone)
- Luiz, his Attendant (lyric baritone or tenor)
- Don Alhambra del Bolero, the Grand Inquisitor of Spain (bass-baritone)
- Marco Palmieri, Venetian Gondolier (tenor)
- Giuseppe Palmieri, Venetian Gondolier (baritone)
- Antonio, Venetian Gondolier (baritone)
- Francesco, Venetian Gondolier (tenor)
- Giorgio, Venetian Gondolier (bass)
- Annibale, Venetian Gondolier (speaking role/chorus)
- The Duchess of Plaza-Toro (contralto)
- Casilda, her Daughter (soprano)
- Gianetta, Contadina (soprano)
- Tessa, Contadina (mezzo-soprano)
- Fiametta, Contadina (soprano)
- Vittoria, Contadina (mezzo-soprano)
- Giulia, Contadina (mezzo-soprano or soprano)
- Inez, the King's foster-mother (contralto)
- Chorus of Gondoliers and Contadine, Men-at-Arms, Heralds and Pages

== Synopsis ==
=== Act I ===
The scene opens in Venice with 24 farm girls declaring their passionate love for a pair of gondoliers, Marco and Giuseppe Palmieri. These two gondoliers are so gallant and peerless in their manly beauty that the maidens are waiting for them to select brides before they can consider other suitors. A large group of merry gondoliers enter, saying that they adore the young women, who explain that the two brothers must choose first. When the Palmieri brothers enter, the women present them with flowers. The two gondoliers amiably offer to pick their brides in a game of blind man's buff. They appear to be cheating by peeking out from under their blindfolds, however. Eventually, from the crowd of maidens, Giuseppe picks Tessa, and Marco picks Gianetta – "Just the very girl I wanted!" (although the two then politely offer to switch). All leave to go to church for the double wedding.

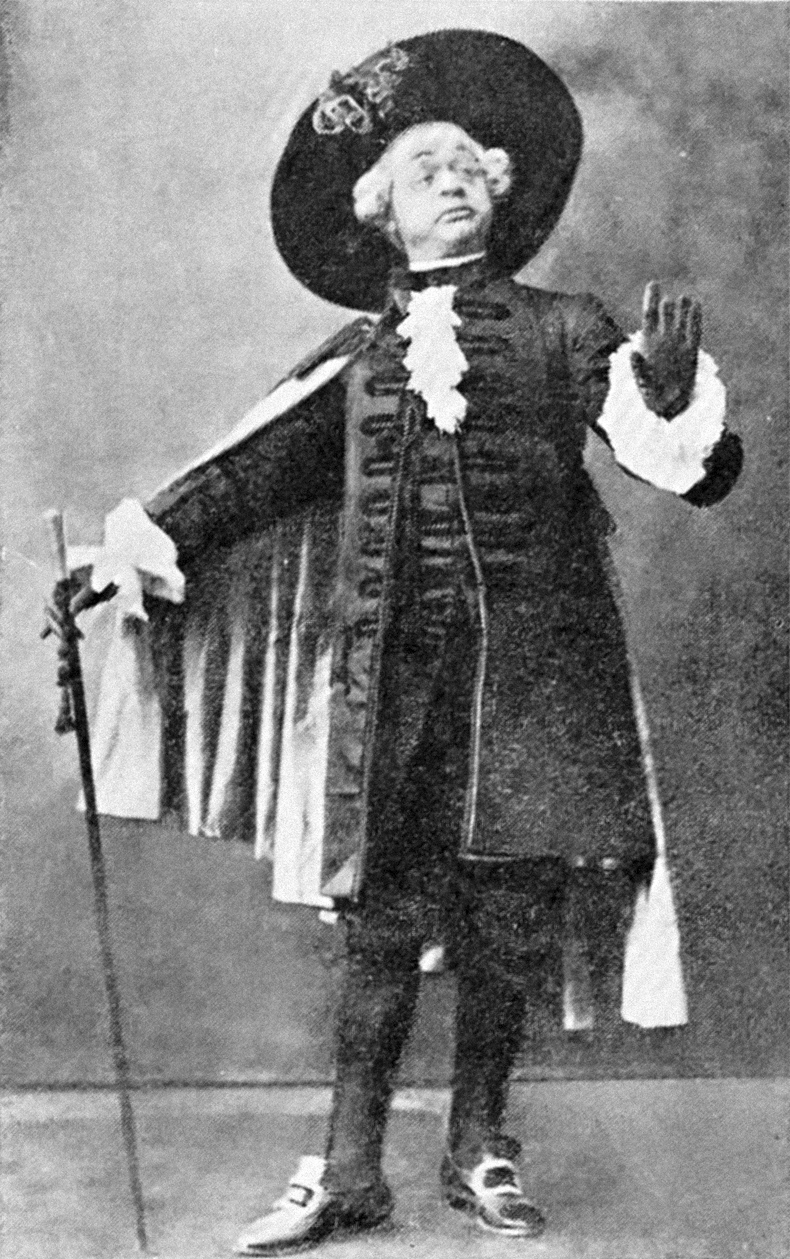
W. H. Denny as The Grand Inquisitor

His Grace the Duke of Plaza Toro (Count Matadoro, Baron Picadoro), Her Grace the Duchess, their beautiful daughter Casilda, and their drummer, Luiz, now arrive in Venice from Spain. They have come to meet Don Alhambra del Bolero, the Grand Inquisitor of Spain. As Luiz goes to announce the Duke's presence, the Duke and Duchess tell their daughter a secret that they have kept for twenty years – when she was only six months old, she was married to the infant son and heir of the King of Barataria. (Note: In Don Quixote, Sancho becomes the governor of an island called Barataria.) She is indignant, since the union was conducted without her consent. The infant prince was taken from his home by the Grand Inquisitor, after the king of Barataria became a Wesleyan Methodist "of the most bigoted and persecuting type", and taken to Venice. The King of Barataria was recently killed in an insurrection, and the hidden prince is now king. As the wife of the new king, Casilda is now the reigning queen of Barataria, and her parents have brought her to meet with the Grand Inquisitor to be introduced to her husband. We soon discover, however that Casilda is secretly in love with Luiz. Left alone together, she tells him of her infant marriage, and they resign themselves to a life forever apart, with only their happy memories to comfort them.

When the Grand Inquisitor arrives, he explains that the prince was raised incognito by Baptisto Palmieri, a humble gondolier, who had a young son of his own about the same age. The gondolier was a drunkard and eventually forgot which boy was his own son and which boy was the prince of Barataria. The two boys (Marco and Giuseppe) grew up and now are both gondoliers themselves. Fortunately, the nurse who took care of the infant prince (and who happens to be Luiz's mother), is now living in the mountains, married to "a highly respectable brigand". Don Alhambra says that he has located her and that she will be able to reveal which of the two gondoliers is the lost prince. If not, he says, "then the persuasive influence of the torture chamber will jog her memory."

In the next scene, the two gondoliers have married Tessa and Gianetta, and as they are extolling the virtues of marriage, Don Alhambra arrives and informs them that one of them is the King of Barataria, but no one knows which. Despite being Republicans, the gondoliers and their new wives are delighted, and agree to go to Barataria at once, acting as one individual until the actual king is identified. The Grand Inquisitor tells them, however, that women are not admitted until the actual king is identified, and then each couple can be reunited. The Grand Inquisitor neglects to mention that the King is married to Casilda, fearing that it would cause the men to refuse to leave their new wives. As the two wives are imagining what it will be like to be a queen, their friends enter, and Marco and Giuseppe announce their discovery and promise to reign in a Republican fashion. They announce that in their kingdom, "All shall equal be" and will create new posts such as "the Lord High Coachman on the Box, the Lord High Vagabond in the Stocks". All the men then set sail for Barataria, leaving their wives behind in Venice.

=== Act II ===
In Barataria, the gondolier-courtiers are all enjoying living under "a monarchy that's tempered with Republican equality". Marco and Giuseppe have been doing all the work around the palace for the past three months – it is the privilege of royalty! They are happy enough with this arrangement, except that they are worried about having to share a single portion of rations between the two of them, and they miss their wives. Soon, however, all the women arrive, having risked the long sea voyage from Venice – they could no longer stand the separation. In delight, the reunited couples have a magnificent banquet and a dance (a cachucha).

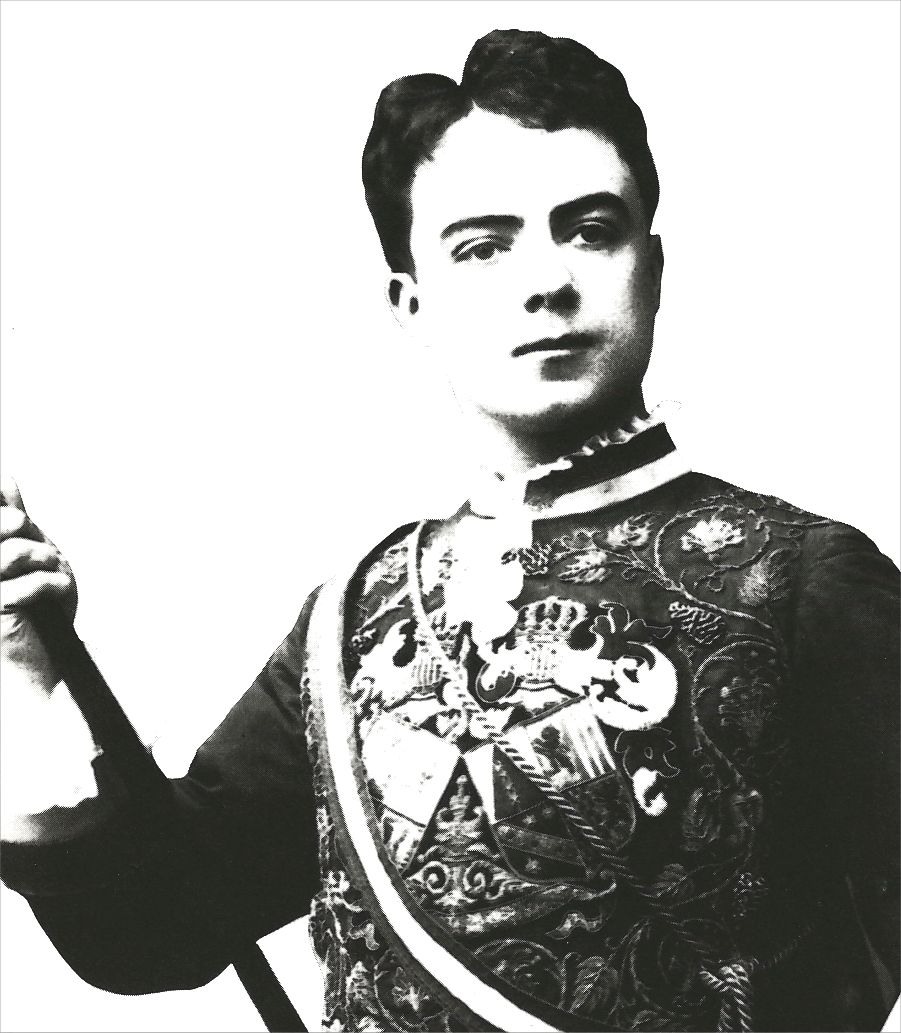
Pounds as Marco, Act II

The Grand Inquisitor arrives at the ball to find that the Republican gondoliers have promoted everyone to the nobility. He explains that there must be a distinction between commoners and those of rank, warning that "when everyone is somebody, then no-one's anybody". He then breaks the news that one of the gondoliers had married Casilda when a baby and therefore is an unintentional bigamist. The gondoliers attempt to console their wives, who are distraught to discover that neither one will be queen, and that one married someone who is already married.

The Duke and Duchess of Plaza Toro soon arrive with the beautiful Casilda. They are now dressed in style, and the Duke explains how he was applied for by the public under the Limited Liability Company Act, and how they now earn a very good living. Appalled, however, at the lack of pomp and ceremony with which they were received, he attempts to educate the two monarchs in proper royal behaviour. After a lesson in etiquette, the two Palmieri brothers are left alone with Casilda. She agrees to be an obedient wife, but warns them that she is "over head and ears in love with someone else." Seizing this opportunity, the two men introduce their wives. The three women and two men sing a quintet about their unprecedented predicament.

Don Alhambra brings in the nurse who had tended the infant prince of Barataria twenty years ago. She reveals that when the Grand Inquisitor came to steal the prince, she had loyally hidden him away, and given Don Alhambra her own young son instead. Thus, the king is neither Marco nor Giuseppe, but her own son, Luiz. This resolves the romantic entanglements to everyone's satisfaction. Casilda finds that she is already married to the man she loves, Luiz. The two gondoliers surrender their crown to Luiz and, though a bit disappointed that neither will be a king, they can return happily to Venice with their wives. There is a final dance for the full company, reprising the gondoliers' Act I duet and the cachucha.

== Musical numbers ==
Excerpts from the 1919 His Master's Voice recording of the opera, conducted by Arthur Wood
We're called gondolieri

Dance a cachucha

There lived a king ... In a contemplative fashion

- Overture

Act I

"Try we life-long"

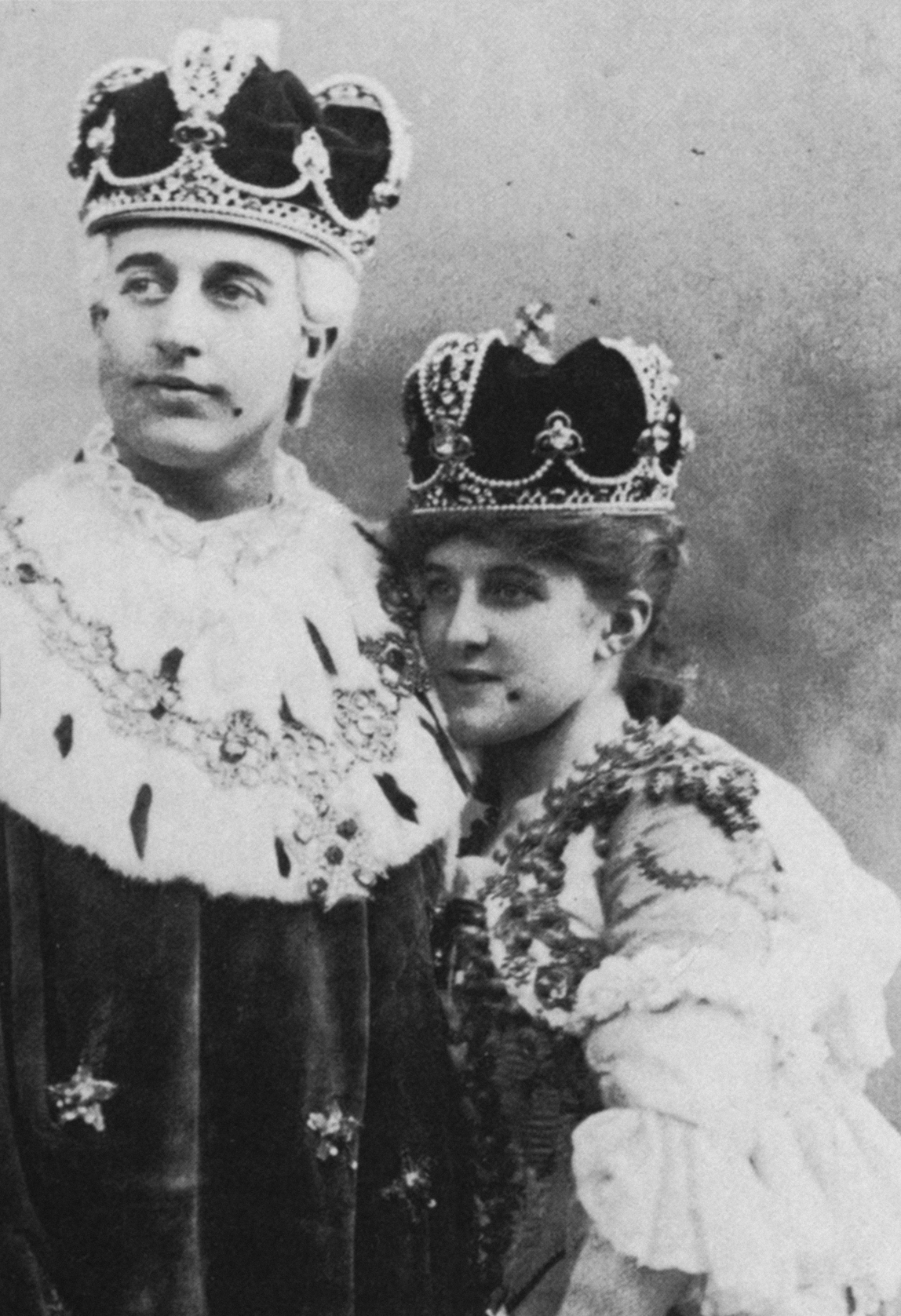
Brownlow and Moore as Luiz and Casilda

- 1. "List and learn" (Tessa, Gianetta, Antonio, Marco, Giuseppe, and Chorus of Contadine and Gondoliers)
- 2. "From the sunny Spanish shore" (Duke, Duchess, Casilda, and Luiz)
- 3. "In enterprise of martial kind" (Duke with Duchess, Casilda, and Luiz)
- 4. "O rapture, when alone together" (Casilda and Luiz)
- 5. "There was a time" (Casilda and Luiz)
- 6. "I stole the prince" (Don Alhambra with Duke, Duchess, Casilda, and Luiz)
- 7. "But, bless my heart" (Casilda and Don Alhambra)
- 8. "Try we life-long" (Duke, Duchess, Casilda, Luiz, and Don Alhambra)
- 9. "Bridegroom and bride" (Chorus)
- 9a. "When a merry maiden marries" (Tessa)
- 10. "Kind sir, you cannot have the heart" (Gianetta)
- 10a. "Then one of us will be a Queen" (Marco, Giuseppe, Gianetta, and Tessa)

Act II

- 11. "Of happiness the very pith" (Marco, Giuseppe, and Chorus of Men)
- 12. "Rising early in the morning" (Giuseppe with Chorus)
- 13. "Take a pair of sparkling eyes" (Marco)
- 14. "Here we are at the risk of our lives" (Giuseppe, Tessa, Gianetta, Marco, and Chorus)
- 15. "Dance a cachucha" (Chorus and Dance)
- 16. "There lived a king" (Don Alhambra with Marco and Giuseppe)
- 17. "In a contemplative fashion" (Marco, Giuseppe, Gianetta, and Tessa)
- 18. "With ducal pomp" (Chorus of Men with Duke and Duchess)
- 19. "On the day when I was wedded" (Duchess)
- 20. "To help unhappy commoners" (Duke and Duchess)
- 21. "I am a courtier grave and serious" (Duke, Duchess, Casilda, Marco, and Giuseppe)
- 22. "Here is a case unprecedented" (Marco, Giuseppe, Casilda, Gianetta, Tessa, and Chorus)

== Productions ==
The Gondoliers was immediately a hit in London, playing for 554 performances, the fourth longest of the series (after The Mikado, H.M.S. Pinafore and Patience). It earned more money than any other Savoy opera in its original run. 20,000 copies of the published score were sold on publication, and over 70,000 copies of various arrangements were sold within a few days. D'Oyly Carte's "E" Company mounted the first provincial production on 19 February 1890 in Preston. From then on, it was never absent from the touring repertory until it was omitted from the final two seasons (September 1980–February 1982) before the closing of the D'Oyly Carte Opera Company. Percy Anderson refreshed his original costume designs in 1917, 1919 and 1928.

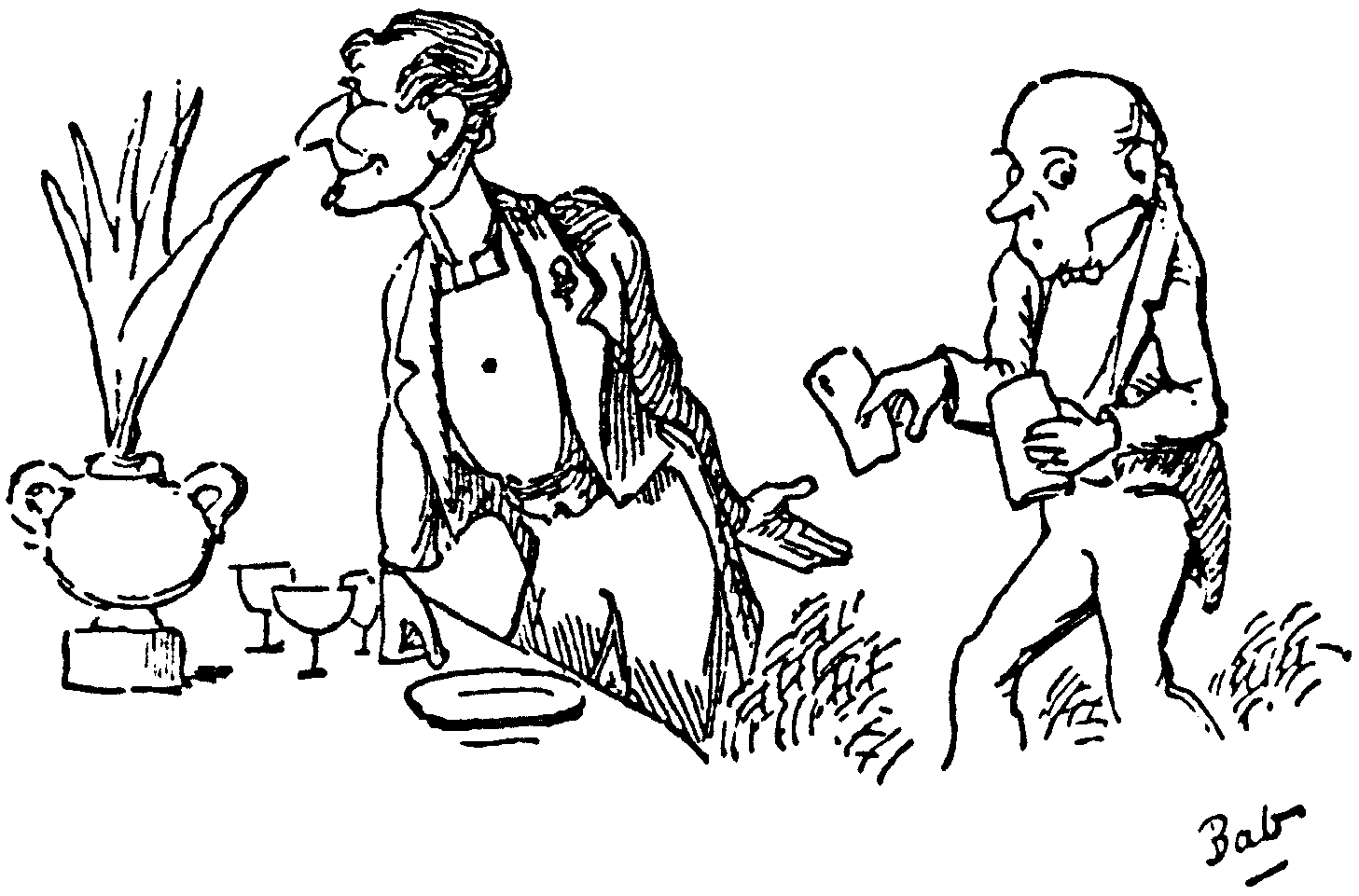
"At charity dinners, the best of speech-spinners, I get 10% of the takings!"

The opera fared less well in New York. It opened at the New Park Theatre on 7 January 1890 and was immediately panned. Gilbert "refused to indorse [sic] the company sent to New York ... because he considered the company a 'scratch' one." Carte came to New York to investigate and closed the production on 13 February. He brought in replacements for most of the cast, and remounted the production at Palmer's Theatre on 18 February. However, the damage was done, and the production ran for just 103 performances in total. The New York press dubbed the opera "the gone-dollars." The first production on the European continent was given at the Theater an der Wien, Vienna (as Die Gondoliere) on 20 September 1890. In Australia, its first authorised performance was on 25 October 1890 at the Princess Theatre, Melbourne, produced by J. C. Williamson.

A new production, with new sets and costumes designed by Charles Ricketts, was prepared for the opening of the renovated Savoy Theatre on 21 October 1929. The critic Ernest Newman wrote: "It was a subtle stroke to open with The Gondoliers; there is a peculiar richness of blood in the music of this work that makes the new theatre and the new designs and dresses by Mr. Charles Ricketts particularly appropriate." The performance was conducted by Malcolm Sargent, and the theatre's only box was occupied by Lady Gilbert. Peter Goffin designed new touring sets in 1957, and another notable new production was staged by the company in 1958 at the Princes Theatre with sets and costumes by Goffin. In 1967, new costumes were designed by Luciana Arrighi, with new sets by John Stoddart.

The first non-D'Oyly Carte professional production in the United Kingdom was given by Scottish Opera on 12 December 1968, with Ian Wallace as the Duke. There was also a production by the New Sadler's Wells Opera in February 1984, with John Fryatt as the Duke and Donald Adams as Don Alhambra. A Mafia-themed adaptation of the opera, by John Doyle and Sarah Travis, was given at the Watermill Theatre and transferred to the Apollo Theatre in the West End in 2001. The production utilised Doyle's signature conceit of the actors playing their own orchestra instruments.

The following table shows the history of the D'Oyly Carte productions in London and New York during Gilbert's lifetime:

Theatre	Opening date	Closing date	Perfs.	Details
Savoy Theatre	7 December 1889	20 June 1891	554	First London run.
New Park Theatre, New York	7 January 1890	13 February 1890	103	Authorised American production.
Palmer's Theatre, New York	18 February 1890	19 April 1890	103	Authorised American production.
Savoy Theatre	22 March 1898	21 May 1898	62	First London Revival; interrupted for the production of The Beauty Stone from 28 May – 16 July 1898.
Savoy Theatre	17 July 1898	17 September 1898	63	First London Revival; interrupted for the production of The Beauty Stone from 28 May – 16 July 1898.
Savoy Theatre	22 January 1907	24 August 1907	75	First Savoy repertory season; played with three other operas (closing date shown is of the entire season).
Savoy Theatre	18 January 1909	27 March 1909	22	Second Savoy repertory season; played with five other operas (closing date shown is of the entire season).

== Historical casting ==
The following tables show the casts of the principal early productions and D'Oyly Carte Opera Company touring repertory at various times through to the company's 1982 closure. The roles of Ottavio and the Drummer Boy were credited only in the original production. Notable casting substitutions are shown for the first New York production; otherwise, only first-night casts are shown.

Role	Savoy Theatre 1889	New Park Theatre 1890 (Note: The cast at Palmer's theatre was as follows: Duke: Frank David; Luiz: Helier Le Maistre; Don Alhambra: Fred Billington; Marco: Richard Clarke; Giuseppe: Richard Temple; Antonio: O. J. Rowlands; Francesco: Mr. Boole; Giorgio: Albert Kavanagh; Annibale: Percy Charles; Duchess: Kate Talby; Casilda: Norah Phyllis; Gianetta: Esther Palliser; Tessa: Mary Duggan; Fiametta: Mattie Geoffrey; Vittoria: Cora Tinnie; Giulia: A. Watts; Inez: Rose Leighton)	Savoy Theatre 1898	Savoy Theatre 1907	Savoy Theatre 1909
Duke	Frank Wyatt	George Temple (Note: Henry Lytton took over the role, after the transfer to Palmer's Theatre, as soon as he could arrive from England. He stated in his memoirs that he was the seventh actor to play the role in New York. See Lytton, Henry. Secrets of a Savoyard, chapter 5, Jarrolds, 1922)	William Elton	Charles H. Workman	Charles H. Workman
Luiz	Wallace Brownlow	Arthur Marcel	Jones Hewson	Alec Johnstone	Leo Sheffield
Don Alhambra	W. H. Denny	John A. Muir (Note: Fred Billington after the transfer to Palmer's Theatre.)	Walter Passmore	John Clulow	Rutland Barrington
Marco	Courtice Pounds	Richard Clarke	Charles Kenningham	Pacie Ripple	Henry Herbert
Giuseppe	Rutland Barrington	Duncan Barrington (Note: Brother of Rutland Barrington. At the same time, Rutland Barrington was playing Giuseppe in London, and Richard Temple played the role at Palmer's Theatre.)	Henry Lytton	Richard Green	Henry Lytton
Antonio	A. Medcalf	Helier Le Maistre	Leonard Russell	Overton Moyle	Fred Hewett
Francesco	Charles Rose	Mr. McCarthy	Cory James	Henry Burnand	Ernest Leeman
Giorgio	George de Pledge	Alec Lee	H. G. Gordon	Tom Redmond	Cecil Curtis
Annibale	J. Wilbraham	Percy Charles	Charles Childerstone	Leo Sheffield	A. Laurence Legge
Ottavio	Charles Gilbert	role eliminated	role eliminated	role eliminated	role eliminated
Drummer Boy	Arthur Mansfield	role eliminated	role eliminated	role eliminated	role eliminated
Duchess	Rosina Brandram	Kate Talby	Rosina Brandram	Louie René	Louie René
Casilda	Decima Moore	Agnes McFarland	Ruth Vincent	Marie Wilson	Dorothy Court
Gianetta	Geraldine Ulmar	Esther Palliser/Nita Carritte (Note: On 5 January 1891 Nita Carritte started to play the role of Gianetta, giving around 54 performances, until 27 February. (See www.c20th.com archive))	Emmie Owen	Lilian Coomber	Elsie Spain
Tessa	Jessie Bond	Mary Duggan	Louie Henri	Jessie Rose	Jessie Rose
Fiametta	Nellie Lawrence	A. Watts	Ethel Jackson	Violette Londa	Ethel Lewis
Vittoria	Annie Cole	Miss Sadger	Jessie Rose	Norah McLeod	Beatrice Boarer
Giulia	Norah Phyllis	Grace Pyne	Madge Moyse	Clara Dow	Adrienne Andean
Inez	Annie Bernard	Marie Rochfort	Jessie Pounds	Ethel Morrison	Amy Royston
Role	D'Oyly Carte 1920 Tour	D'Oyly Carte 1930 Tour	D'Oyly Carte 1939 Tour	D'Oyly Carte 1945 Tour	D'Oyly Carte 1951 Tour
Duke	Henry Lytton	Henry Lytton	Martyn Green	Grahame Clifford	Martyn Green
Luiz	Sydney Granville	John Dean	Richard Dunn	Herbert Garry	Henry Goodier
Don Alhambra	Leo Sheffield	Sydney Granville	Sydney Granville	Richard Walker	Richard Watson
Marco	Derek Oldham	Charles Goulding	John Dudley	John Dean	Leonard Osborn
Giuseppe	Frederick Hobbs	Leslie Rands	Leslie Rands	Leslie Rands	Alan Styler
Antonio	Harry Arnold	Richard Walker	Richard Walker	Wynn Dyson	Peter Pratt
Francesco	J. W. Turnbull	Herbert Aitken	Leonard Osborn	C. William Morgan	Thomas Hancock
Giorgio	Allen Morris	L. Radley Flynn	L. Radley Flynn	L. Radley Flynn	L. Radley Flynn
Annibale	Hugh Enes Blackmore	T. Penry Hughes	T. Penry Hughes	Hilton Layland	Stanley Youngman
Duchess	Bertha Lewis	Bertha Lewis	Evelyn Gardiner	Ella Halman	Ella Halman
Casilda	Sylvia Cecil	Winifred Lawson	Margery Abbott	Margery Abbott	Margaret Mitchell
Gianetta	Elsie Griffin	Sylvia Cecil	Helen Roberts	Helen Roberts	Muriel Harding
Tessa	Nellie Briercliffe	Nellie Briercliffe	Marjorie Eyre	Marjorie Eyre	Joan Gillingham
Fiametta	Elsie Chantler	Sybil Gordon	Marjorie Flinn	Ann Nicholson	Enid Walsh
Vittoria	Winifred Downing	Beatrice Elburn	Ivy Sanders	Ivy Sanders	Ceinwen Jones
Giulia	Winifred Williamson	Murielle Barron	Maysie Dean	Laura Crombie	Joyce Wright
Inez	Anna Bethell	Marguerite Hylder	Ella Halman	Caryl Fane	Caryl Fane
Role	D'Oyly Carte 1959 Tour	D'Oyly Carte 1968 Tour	D'Oyly Carte 1975 Tour	D'Oyly Carte 1980 Tour	
Duke	Peter Pratt	John Reed	John Reed	James Conroy-Ward	
Luiz	John Fryatt	Philip Potter	Colin Wright	Harold Sharples	
Don Alhambra	Kenneth Sandford	Kenneth Sandford	Kenneth Sandford	Kenneth Sandford	
Marco	Thomas Round	Ralph Mason	Meston Reid	Meston Reid	
Giuseppe	Alan Styler	Thomas Lawlor	Michael Rayner	Peter Lyon	
Antonio	John Reed	Howard Williamson	James Conroy-Ward	Alan Spencer	
Francesco	Frederick Sinden	David Young	Jeffrey Cresswell	Barry Clark	
Giorgio	George Cook	George Cook	John Broad	Michael Buchan	
Annibale	John Reed	Howard Williamson	James Conroy-Ward	Alistair Donkin	
Duchess	Ann Drummond-Grant	Christene Palmer	Lyndsie Holland	Patricia Leonard	
Casilda	Jennifer Toye	Valerie Masterson	Julia Goss	Evette Davis	
Gianetta	Jean Hindmarsh	Susan Jackson	Pamela Field	Barbara Lilley	
Tessa	Joyce Wright	Pauline Wales	Judi Merri	Lorraine Daniels	
Fiametta	Mary Sansom	Anne Sessions	Marjorie Williams	Suzanne O'Keeffe	
Vittoria	Ceinwen Jones	Marian Martin	Patricia Leonard	Helene Witcombe	
Giulia	Anne Sessions	Julia Goss	Anne Egglestone	Jane Stanford	
Inez	Beti Lloyd-Jones	Beti Lloyd-Jones	Beti Lloyd-Jones	Jill Pert	

== Recordings ==
The 1927 Gondoliers is admired for its excellent cast. The 1961 D'Oyly Carte recording is a good stereo recording and includes complete dialogue. The 1957 Sargent/Glyndebourne and 1991 New D'Oyly Carte recordings are both musically well regarded.

More recent professional productions have been recorded on video by the International Gilbert and Sullivan Festival.

Selected recordings

- 1927 D'Oyly Carte – Conductor: Harry Norris
- 1950 D'Oyly Carte – New Promenade Orchestra, Conductor: Isidore Godfrey
- 1957 Sargent/Glyndebourne – Pro Arte Orchestra, Glyndebourne Festival Chorus, Conductor: Sir Malcolm Sargent
- 1961 D'Oyly Carte (with dialogue) – New Symphony Orchestra of London, Conductor: Isidore Godfrey
- 1972 G&S For All (video; abridged) – G&S Festival Chorus & Orchestra, Conductor: Peter Murray
- 1977 D'Oyly Carte (with dialogue) – Royal Philharmonic Orchestra, Conductor: Royston Nash
- 1982 Brent Walker Productions (video) – Ambrosian Opera Chorus, London Symphony Orchestra, Conductor: Alexander Faris; Stage Director: Peter Wood
- 1991 New D'Oyly Carte – Conductor: John Pryce-Jones
