= Kenneth Sandford =

English actor and singer (1924–2004)

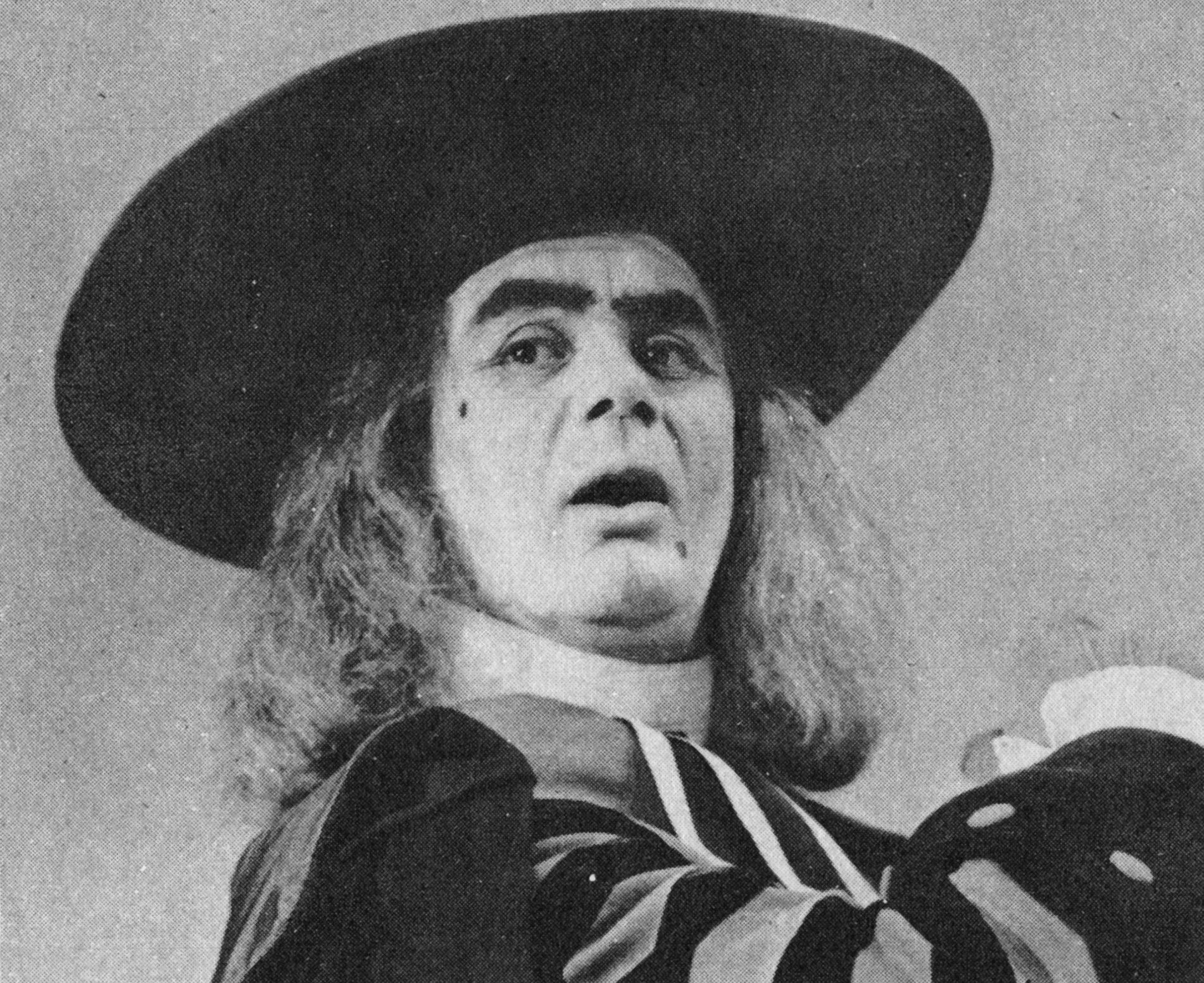
Sandford as Don Alhambra in The Gondoliers

Kenneth Sandford (28 June 1924 – 19 September 2004) was an English singer and actor, best known for his performances in baritone roles of the Savoy Operas of Gilbert and Sullivan.

After service the Royal Air Force during World War II, Sandford turned away from a career in art and studied singing. He performed in musical theatre in the West End and on tour between 1950 and 1956, including 800 performances starring in a revue called Jokers Wild with The Crazy Gang. He also began a concert career. In 1957, he was engaged by the D'Oyly Carte Opera Company and immediately began to perform eight principal roles in repertory, including Pooh-Bah in The Mikado. He remained with the company for 25 years until it closed, also making about twenty recordings with the company, and several recordings for Reader's Digest and others.

In later years, Sandford continued to tour in and direct Gilbert and Sullivan productions, often with his former D'Oyly Carte colleague Roberta Morrell. After The International Gilbert and Sullivan Festival was established in 1994, he often performed and lectured for the festival's audiences and held master classes for its performers.

== Beginnings ==
Kenneth Sandford was born Kenneth Parkin in Godalming, Surrey and raised in Sheffield, where his father became landlord of a pub. Sandford hoped to be an artist, studying painting at the College of Arts and Crafts in Sheffield, where he won a scholarship to the Royal College of Art in London. After he returned from service in the Royal Air Force during World War II, he attended that college, but he took up singing and became intrigued by the theatre. He began to perform in musicals, concerts and oratorios and switched to opera school. At this time he adopted his mother's maiden name as his professional surname, believing that Parkin "hardly rang with theatrical overtones."

Sandford played roles in several shows in the West End and on tour between 1950 and 1956, including Carousel at the Theatre Royal, Drury Lane (1950–51) (understudying and appearing as Billy Bigelow); on tour as Count Igor Staniev in King's Rhapsody; as Sandy Twist in Paint Your Wagon at His Majesty's Theatre (1953–54); in Kismet (understudying and going on for Alfred Drake) and 800 performances starring in a revue called Jokers Wild with The Crazy Gang at Victoria Palace Theatre (1954–56). In April 1955, he appeared in the Royal Variety Show supporting The Crazy Gang in a bill that featured Gracie Fields, George Formby and the young team of Morecambe and Wise. He also sang in concert as a tenor during this period, including a Wigmore Hall recital in April 1951 in songs by composers as diverse as Wolf-Ferrari, Rachmaninoff and Medtner.

In 1952, he married Pauline Joyce, and the couple had a son and a daughter.

== D'Oyly Carte years ==
Sandford joined the D'Oyly Carte Opera Company in 1957, for the pay of £37 and 10 shillings a week (about £700 at 2007 values) He immediately assumed eight principal baritone roles: the Sergeant of Police in The Pirates of Penzance, Archibald Grosvenor in Patience, Private Willis in Iolanthe, King Hildebrand in Princess Ida, Pooh-Bah in The Mikado, Sir Despard Murgatroyd in Ruddigore, Wilfred Shadbolt in The Yeomen of the Guard, and Don Alhambra del Bolero in The Gondoliers. He dropped the role of Sergeant of Police in 1962 (which he found uncomfortably low for his "creamy and slightly breathy" lyric baritone voice) and added Dr. Daly to his repertoire when The Sorcerer was revived in 1971. In 1962, he played Shadbolt in a grand production of Yeomen staged by Anthony Besch at the Tower of London as part of the first City of London Festival. The Times said, "Mr Kenneth Sandford's lean, melancholy, decidedly sympathetic Shadbolt steals the show." By this time, the copyrights on Gilbert and Sullivan had expired and, to Sandford's delight, Besch's production was completely restaged, allowing Sandford to develop a new interpretation of the role.

For the National School of Opera in 1963, Sandford took part along with Janet Baker, Jennifer Vyvyan, Marie Collier and others, in a gala at Sadler's Wells Theatre. The Times praised his "distinguished singing" and added, "we hope this talented singing actor will not remain forever in Savoy opera." Sandford had been invited to join the company of the Glyndebourne Festival in 1961, but with a young family to support he felt he could not abandon the security offered by his D'Oyly Carte contract, and thereafter "it was never the right time or the right financial deal to lure him." Sandford sometimes bridled at the D'Oyly Carte directorial "traditions". He was originally trained in his roles by Eleanor Evans (Mrs. Darrell Fancourt), then the company's stage director. Sandford later recalled,

She was quite a formidable producer and quite insistent that Gilbert and Sullivan needed a different approach from anything I had done before. Wishing to learn the mysteries I made myself very receptive to her ideas [but] through the years I have found that there really isn't such a thing as a traditional way of playing Gilbert and Sullivan.... The important thing is that both the libretto and the music should be treated with the greatest respect... [but] they should not be done without a twinkle in the eye.... But now, you see, I've been given a new dimension. I was allowed to make [Don Alhambra in The Gondoliers] a person.... It took me about two years to get rid of the shackles of my first producer, and then I started using my imagination.... I've enjoyed doing the new productions... because I've been able to rethink [the roles in new productions] completely.... All the time it's moving. It has to move; if it didn't I wouldn't be here. Because I'm quite sure you'd go scatty playing the same parts if you didn't get a lot of fun out of them yourself.... I don't go along with the idea that the operas can only be played one way. But on the other hand they've got to be done the right way.

For the 1975 D'Oyly Carte centenary season, Sandford played all his principal baritone roles as well as King Paramount in the company's first revival of Utopia, Limited since the original production. Andrew Lamb, writing in The Musical Times, thought him "outstanding" in the role. Sandford sang Ludwig in a concert performance of The Grand Duke in the same season. In addition, during that season, Trial by Jury was preceded by an original short play, Dramatic Licence by William Douglas-Home, in which Gilbert, Sullivan and Richard D'Oyly Carte plan the birth of Trial in 1875. Sandford played W. S. Gilbert in the playlet. He remained with the company for twenty-five years, ending on the company's last night, 27 February 1982.

== After the D'Oyly Carte ==
After the D'Oyly Carte Opera Company closed, Sandford continued his association with Gilbert and Sullivan. He acted as managing director of a touring concert group, "The Magic of D'Oyly Carte" (later called "The magic of Gilbert & Sullivan") and along with his friend and former D'Oyly Carte colleague Roberta Morrell, he appeared in and co-directed several Savoy Operas at Gawsworth Hall, Cheshire. Sandford toured North America several times with Geoffrey Shovelton, John Ayldon, Lorraine Daniels and others in a series of Gilbert and Sullivan concerts entitled "The Best of Gilbert & Sullivan", and in other concerts and productions, including at the Berkshire Choral Institute with John Reed in The Gondoliers (1985).

In the 1990s, he gave master classes and performed at Gilbert and Sullivan conferences in Toronto and Philadelphia, and at Buxton's International Gilbert and Sullivan Festival. In 1999 he co-operated with Roberta Morrell in the writing of a book, Merely Corroborative Detail, published in 1999, which combined his biography with detailed notes on the interpretation of his D'Oyly Carte roles.

Sandford died at Market Drayton, Shropshire at the age of 80.

== Recordings ==
Sandford recorded all of his major roles with the D'Oyly Carte Opera Company, except Dr. Daly, for Decca Records. He also recorded several parts with the company that he never performed with them on stage (although in subsequent years he performed some of them): Counsel for the Plaintiff in Trial by Jury (1964); Usher in Trial (1975); Phantis and Lord Dramaleigh in a recording of Utopia excerpts (1964), and Thomas Brown in The Zoo (1978), making about twenty recordings in all for the company. Sandford took part in the 1965 BBC television broadcast of Patience as Grosvenor, he played Pooh-Bah in the 1966 film version of The Mikado, and he was the voice of Sir Despard in the 1967 Halas & Batchelor Ruddigore cartoon.

Sandford also participated in a Reader's Digest LP collection, "The Best of Gilbert & Sullivan" in 1963. Contractually prohibited from recording the roles he had played with the D'Oyly Carte Opera Company, Sandford instead sings excerpts from several of the Gilbert and Sullivan roles that he never played or recorded during his years with the company, including the Pirate King in Pirates, the Earl of Mountararat in Iolanthe, the Duke of Plaza-Toro and Giuseppe in The Gondoliers, and Colonel Calverley in Patience.
