= Richard Walker (baritone) =

English singer and actor (1897–1989)

Walker as the Sergeant of Police

Richard Walker (18 November 1897 – 26 August 1989) was an English opera singer and actor, best known for his performances in the baritone roles of the Savoy Operas with the D'Oyly Carte Opera Company. Between 1932 and 1939 Walker was married to D'Oyly Carte chorister Ena Martin. He married the company's principal soprano Helen Roberts in 1944.

After serving in the Coldstream Guards, Walker began his career in touring in concerts and revues. He joined D'Oyly Carte at age 27 and remained with the company for 25 years. At first playing mostly smaller roles and understudying larger ones, by 1942 Walker had been promoted as a principal baritone of the company, playing roles like Pooh Bah in The Mikado. His total of thirty-five Savoy Opera roles is the D'Oyly Carte Opera Company's all-time record.

After leaving the company, Walker and Roberts were engaged in Australia by J. C. Williamson to Australia and New Zealand throughout the 1950s and early 1960s in Gilbert and Sullivan as well as other works in their repertory. He also stage directed. In the early 1970s, they toured for more than four years in the original Australian production of My Fair Lady and presented Gilbert and Sullivan in two-person entertainments throughout the United States and Canada.

== Life and career ==
Richard Walker was born in Mansfield, Nottinghamshire. He served for a time in the Coldstream Guards. Walker studied singing at the Midland Conservatoire of Music and earned a second degree (Licentiate) at the London College of Music. He began his career by touring for two years in concerts and revues.

=== D'Oyly Carte years ===
Walker joined the chorus of the smaller of D'Oyly Carte's two companies on tour in 1924. Soon he was filling in for baritone roles such as Captain Corcoran in H.M.S. Pinafore and the Lieutenant of the Tower in The Yeomen of the Guard. He also played Giorgio and then Antonio in The Gondoliers. He transferred to D'Oyly Carte's principal company in 1927, playing Antonio, and, from 1929, Guron in Princess Ida.

During the 1930s and early 1940s, Walker played a variety of parts, both in his own right and as an occasional substitute. His own roles from 1932 were the Usher in Trial by Jury, Bobstay in H.M.S. Pinafore, Samuel in The Pirates of Penzance, Guron, and Antonio, which he performed in a BBC broadcast from the Savoy Theatre during the company's 1932–33 London season. From 1935 he shared the role of Bouncer in Cox and Box with Darrell Fancourt. In 1937 he added the role of the Notary in The Sorcerer. In 1940 he switched from Bouncer to Cox in Cox and Box, and from Usher to Counsel for the Plaintiff in Trial by Jury. He also took on the small roles of Major Murgatroyd in Patience and Second Citizen, and the next year, Second Yeomen in The Yeomen of the Guard. Roles in which he occasionally deputised for Fancourt or Sydney Granville were King Hildebrand in Princess Ida, the Pirate King in The Pirates of Penzance, Earl Mountararat and Private Willis in Iolanthe, Colonel Calverley in Patience, Sir Roderic Murgatroyd in Ruddigore, the title role and Pooh-Bah in The Mikado, Wilfred Shadbolt in The Yeomen of the Guard, and Don Alhambra in The Gondoliers.

In 1942, Walker succeeded Granville as principal "heavy" baritone, playing the Sergeant of Police in The Pirates of Penzance, Shadbolt, Don Alhambra, and Pooh-Bah. In succeeding years he added to these the Usher, Private Willis and Boatswain. He filled in for Fancourt from time to time as Mountararat, Colonel Calverley, and the Mikado, and he also occasionally played Grosvenor in Patience. The Gilbert and Sullivan historian Colin Prestige wrote of him, "Richard Walker knew exactly the limit between comedy and buffoonery. ... His Wilfred Shadbolt was sardonic, his Don Alhambra del Bolero urbane, his Pooh-Bah sanctimonious." Walker married a fellow company member, Helen Roberts, on 31 July 1944. Earlier that month, the two found themselves very close to an exploding German rocket near Piccadilly Circus, as they approached a restaurant. They were not seriously hurt, but just before they went on stage that evening as Wilfred and Elsie in The Yeomen of the Guard, Walker proposed marriage.

Beginning in 1947, both Walker and Roberts began losing roles to other performers engaged by the company, despite their continuing to garner excellent reviews. Richard Watson took over Walker's former roles of Pooh-Bah and Don Alhambra, and the two now shared the roles of Bouncer and Private Willis. On 31 July 1948, Walker and Roberts left the company. Walker was doing concert work and had returned from a production of The Gondoliers in Limerick, Ireland, in 1949, when D'Oyly Carte asked him to step in as an emergency replacement, initially filling in as Grosvenor in Patience (Prestige wrote that his "interpretation ... can only be described as magnificent") and then Bouncer, Counsel, Bobstay, Pish-Tush, the Lieutenant, and Giuseppe in The Gondoliers for the remainder of the season. His total of 35 Savoy Opera roles while a member of the D'Oyly Carte Opera Company is the company's all-time record.

=== Australia and touring ===
After his last season with D'Oyly Carte, Walker and Roberts were engaged by the J. C. Williamson Gilbert and Sullivan Opera Company, and toured Australia and New Zealand throughout the 1950s and early 1960s. When the Williamsons played Gilbert and Sullivan, as they did for extended tours every five or six years, Walker sang his familiar roles, as well as Dick Deadeye in Pinafore and Sergeant Meryll in Yeomen, and he directed the operas. Walker and Roberts also performed in musical comedies in Australia under other management. From 1959, they toured for more than four years in the original Australian production of My Fair Lady, Walker as Alfred P. Doolittle and Roberts as Mrs. Eynsford-Hill. They then settled in Sydney. Walker later appeared in the Williamson production of A Funny Thing Happened on the Way to the Forum. In 1967, he joined the Elizabethan Theatre Company, playing Frosch in Die Fledermaus.

Walker also presented Gilbert and Sullivan with Roberts in two-person entertainments throughout the United States and Canada beginning in the 1950s. President Eisenhower asked them to give their concert programme at his pre-inauguration party at the White House following his re-election in 1956, but they were unable to attend, as they were then in Australia. Walker was the Honorary President of the Gilbert and Sullivan Society of New York from 1951 until his death.name=TGSSNY/>

Walker died in Sydney, Australia, at the age of 91. His widow later returned to England, where she died in 2010.

== Recordings ==
Walker's recordings with D'Oyly Carte were Antonio in The Gondoliers (1927), and Boatswain in H.M.S. Pinafore (1949). Reviewing the former, The Gramophone commented, "Richard Walker has the best chance of the soloists, and takes full advantage of it."

== See also ==
J. C. Williamson
