= Helen Roberts =

English singer and actress (1912 – 2010)

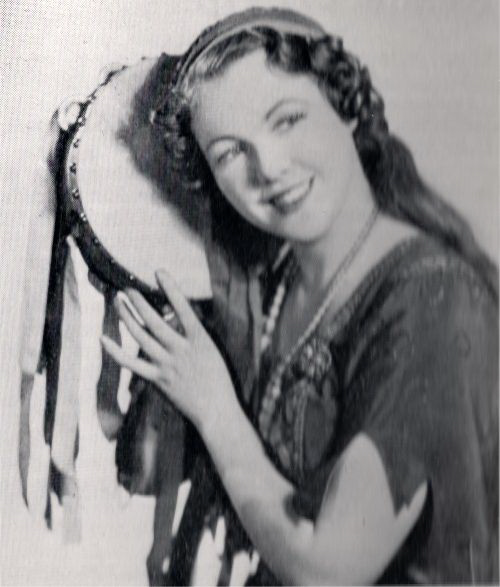
Roberts as Elsie Maynard

Helen Florence Roberts (15 July 1912 – 12 December 2010), later known as Betty Roberts and by her married name, Betty Walker, was an English singer and actress, best known for her performances in soprano roles of the Savoy Operas with the D'Oyly Carte Opera Company.

After beginning her career touring in Italy and then England in grand opera, Roberts joined the D'Oyly Carte Opera Company as a principal soprano in 1938. She remained with that company for ten years, marrying another company member, the baritone Richard Walker, in 1944.

After four more years of theatre in Britain, the couple moved to the US, where they presented Gilbert and Sullivan in two-person entertainments throughout North America. They then moved to Australia, where they joined the J. C. Williamson Gilbert and Sullivan Opera Company. They toured with Williamson in the late 1950s and early 1960s. They also appeared in musicals, including a four-year engagement in the original Australian production of My Fair Lady. After her husband's death in 1989, she returned to England.

== Early life and career ==
Roberts was born in Cleethorpes, Lincolnshire. Her father was a surveyor for Lloyd's of London. He moved Helen, her two sisters and brother, to Naples, Italy, for five years immediately after World War I. She returned to England, to finish her schooling, and then studied music at the Royal Academy of Music, privately and later in Italy. She toured in Italy with the Milan Opera Company, singing the role of Norina in Don Pasquale by Donizetti. After returning to England, she toured in Offenbach's The Tales of Hoffmann as the Doll and Antonia and also sang briefly in the chorus of the Glyndebourne Festival Opera.

In September 1938, Roberts was engaged by the D'Oyly Carte Opera Company as a principal soprano. She began to perform there under the name Betty Roberts, but Rupert D'Oyly Carte soon asked her to change it to something more fitting to a leading lady, and she returned to her birth forename. During her decade of performing with the D'Oyly Carte company, she appeared regularly as Josephine in H.M.S. Pinafore, Mabel in The Pirates of Penzance, the title character in Princess Ida, Elsie Maynard in The Yeomen of the Guard, and Gianetta in The Gondoliers.

She soon added the role of Phyllis in Iolanthe to her repertoire. She sometimes also played as Yum-Yum in The Mikado and briefly played the title character in Patience. This was the longest continuous D'Oyly Carte career of any of the company's principal sopranos. The Times repeatedly praised her singing and appearance, and The Manchester Guardian, reviewing the company's 1941 tour, wrote, "One of the chief pleasures of last night's performance was the lovely voice of Miss Helen Roberts." During the war, she sang in concerts and on the radio in aid of public morale.

Roberts married fellow company member Richard Walker on 31 July 1944. Earlier that month, the two found themselves very close to an exploding German rocket near Piccadilly Circus, as they approached a restaurant. They were not seriously hurt, but just before they went on stage that evening as Wilfred and Elsie in The Yeomen of the Guard, Walker proposed marriage.

== Later years ==
At the end of July 1948, Roberts and her husband, seeing some of their roles being given to new talent, left the D'Oyly Carte Opera Company. After a year playing in other theatre in Britain (he returned for part of that time to D'Oyly Carte). Roberts and Walker also gave two-person concert tours of Gilbert and Sullivan throughout North America in the early 1950s, where they lived for several years.

They then joined J. C. Williamson Limited to tour Australia and New Zealand. U.S. President Eisenhower asked the Walkers to give their concert programme at his pre-inauguration party at the White House following his re-election in 1956, but they were unable to travel from Australia to attend. The Williamson company played Gilbert and Sullivan for extended tours every few years into the 1960s, and Roberts reprised her D'Oyly Carte roles in these, adding the new roles of Plaintiff in Trial by Jury and Rose Maybud in Ruddigore. Roberts and Walker also performed in musical comedies in Australia under other management, including touring for more than four years in the original Australian production of My Fair Lady, beginning in 1959, in which she played Mrs. Eynsford-Hill (the mother of Eliza's suitor Freddy), and he played Eliza's father, Alfred P. Doolittle. She would later return to the role. She continued to sing into her 70s, giving concerts to benefit charities. She enjoyed painting and photography as hobbies.

== Last years ==
After her husband's death in 1989, Roberts returned to England and lived first at Blandford Forum (where she continued to do charity work) and, in her last years, at Gillingham, Dorset, in a retirement home where her two sisters lived. She died at The Malthouse, Gillingham, in December 2010, aged 98.
