= Sydney Granville =

British singer and actor (1880–1959)

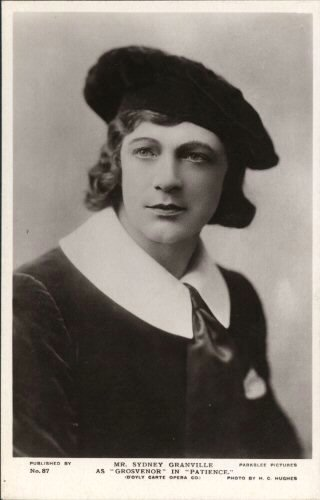
as Grosvenor in Patience

Sydney Granville (born Walter Dewhurst; 1880 – 27 December 1959) was an English singer and actor, best known for his performances in the Savoy Operas with the D'Oyly Carte Opera Company.

After early theatrical work in musical comedy, straight plays and grand opera, he joined the D'Oyly Carte company, at first in the chorus, then in lyric baritone roles and finally in the comic bass-baritone parts of the Gilbert and Sullivan operas. With brief breaks when he performed for other managements, Granville was with D'Oyly Carte from 1907 to 1942.

== Life and career ==
Granville was born Walter Dewhurst in Bolton, Lancashire. His early stage appearances were on tour in a musical comedy entitled Dorcas, a romantic drama, The God of War, and in grand opera with the Moody-Manners Opera Company.

=== Early career – lyric baritone ===
Granville joined the D'Oyly Carte Opera Company chorus in 1907, soon understudying the role of Lord Mountararat in Iolanthe at the Savoy Theatre in London. When the season ended, he toured with the company in the chorus and played the small role of Selworthy in the curtain raiser After All!. The next season, at the Savoy, he played John Lloyd in Fenn and Faraday's A Welsh Sunset, given as a curtain raiser to H.M.S. Pinafore and The Pirates of Penzance, and he understudied Henry Lytton in the role of Dick Deadeye in Pinafore.

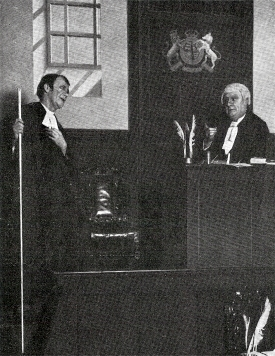
Granville (left) as the Usher in Trial by Jury, 1920, with Leo Sheffield as the Learned Judge

On tour with D'Oyly Carte from 1908 to 1914, Granville played a variety of Gilbert and Sullivan roles, including the Counsel to the Plaintiff in Trial by Jury, Boatswain in Pinafore, Samuel in The Pirates of Penzance, Colonel Calverley in Patience, Strephon in Iolanthe, Arac in Princess Ida, Pish-Tush in The Mikado, the Lieutenant of the Tower in The Yeomen of the Guard, and Luiz in The Gondoliers.

In March 1914, Granville left the company. He played in pantomime as the Demon Killjoy in Cinderella at the London Palladium. He rejoined D'Oyly Carte, during its 1915–16 tour, playing only Strephon and Luiz in a nine-opera repertoire. The Manchester Guardian commented on his neglect, "Mr. Sydney Granville, who has been heard too little, was a delightful Strephon." In the next season, he lost the role of Strephon to Leo Sheffield when the latter rejoined the company. Granville left D'Oyly Carte for the second time in 1917.

Following the death of the veteran D'Oyly Carte performer Fred Billington in November 1917, Sheffield took on most of his bass-baritone roles. A year later, Granville returned to play the lyric baritone roles that Sheffield had earlier played. These roles were the Counsel, Boatswain, Samuel, Strephon, Florian in Princess Ida, Pish-Tush, the Lieutenant, and Luiz, later swapping the Counsel for the Usher in Trial, adding the Colonel and later Grosvenor in Patience, and swapping Luiz for Giuseppe in The Gondoliers. In 1920, the critic Neville Cardus wrote of him, "As fine a Savoyard as any in the company, Mr. Sydney Granville acted and sang capitally. He has a rare instinct for the gauntness of the English ballad manner which is the secret of Gilbert's lyrical style ... also he never loses the suspicion of parody which so often underlines Sullivan's tunes." In 1921 Granville added to his repertoire the role of Cox in Cox and Box, and by 1924, he had given up the smaller roles of Samuel and the Lieutenant. In 1925 he transferred to D'Oyly Carte's smaller touring company, playing Colonel Calverley in Patience, Mountararat in Iolanthe, the title role in The Mikado, and Sir Roderic Murgatroyd in Ruddigore.

=== Later career – "heavy" baritone ===
as Sir Despard in Ruddigore

In 1925 Granville left the company for the third time, touring in Australia and New Zealand with the J. C. Williamson organisation in 1926–27 in the Gilbert and Sullivan bass-baritone roles that he would later play with D'Oyly Carte. Returning to England in 1927, he made several radio broadcasts for the BBC, including The Red Pen, "a sort of opera" by A. P. Herbert and Geoffrey Toye. He toured in Robert Stolz's musical The Blue Train, and then played Lockit in The Beggar's Opera, at the Lyric Theatre, Hammersmith, in 1928.

Granville rejoined the D'Oyly Carte company in 1928, replacing the retiring Leo Sheffield in the bass-baritone roles. Except during Sheffield's return for the 22-week London Season in 1929–30, Granville performed these "heavy" baritone roles until his retirement in December 1942. He played the Learned Judge in Trial, the Sergeant of Police in Pirates, Private Willis in Iolanthe, Pooh-Bah in The Mikado, Sir Despard Murgatroyd in Ruddigore, and Don Alhambra in The Gondoliers. He added Wilfred Shadbolt in Yeomen in 1929 and King Hildebrand in Princess Ida in 1931. In 1938, The Observer wrote that Granville "has worked up from stripling parts like Strephon to become, after twenty-five odd years, one of the great Savoy veterans." By 1939, he had given up the Judge and Willis.

"Granny," as he was known in the D'Oyly Carte company, was married to the chorister and small-part player Anna Bethell (known principally for playing Mrs. Partlett in The Sorcerer whenever it was revived. Bethell later served as stage director of the D'Oyly Carte Opera Company from 1947–49 and for the J. C. Williamson Gilbert and Sullivan Company.

Granville died in Stockport, Cheshire, in 1959 at the age of 79.

== Recordings ==
Granville was Pooh-Bah in the 1939 Technicolor film version of The Mikado.

With D'Oyly Carte, he participated in the following His Master's Voice recordings of the operas: H.M.S. Pinafore (1922 – as Captain Corcoran and Boatswain), Princess Ida (1924 – Florian), Iolanthe (1929 – Private Willis), Pinafore (1930 – Boatswain), abridged Gondoliers (1931 – Don Alhambra), abridged Pirates (1931 – Sergeant), Ruddigore (1931 – Despard), abridged Yeomen (1931 – Shadbolt), and Mikado (1936 – Pooh-Bah).

== Sources ==
- Joseph, Tony (1994). D'Oyly Carte Opera Company, 1875–1982: An Unofficial History. London: Bunthorne Books. ISBN 0-9507992-1-1
- Rollins, Cyril; R. John Witts (1961). The D'Oyly Carte Opera Company in Gilbert and Sullivan Operas. London: Michael Joseph, Ltd.
