= Bridget D'Oyly Carte =

British opera company and hotel owner

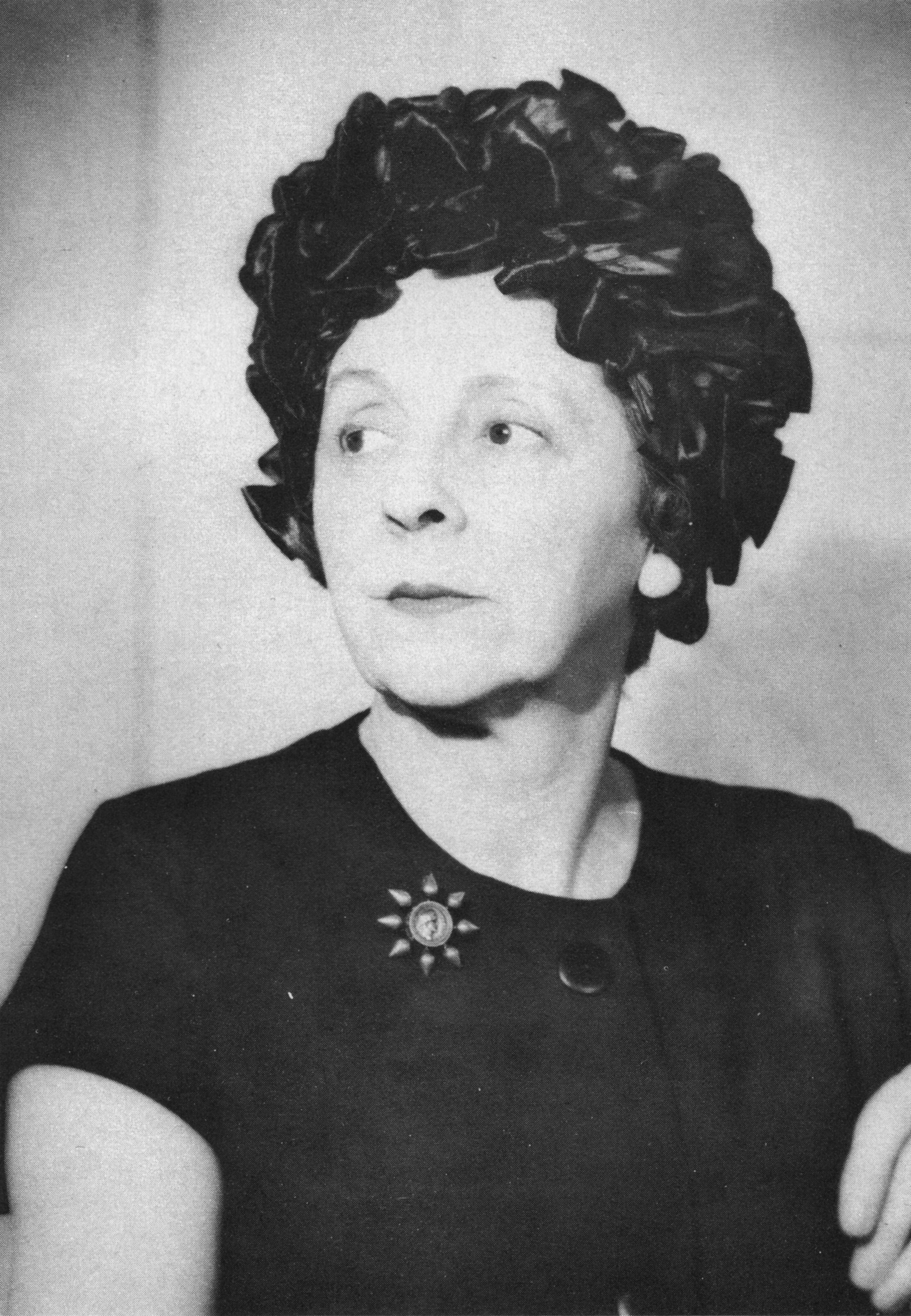
Bridget D'Oyly Carte, circa 1962

Dame Bridget D'Oyly Carte DBE (25 March 1908 – 2 May 1985) was head of the D'Oyly Carte Opera Company from 1948 until 1982. She was the granddaughter of the impresario Richard D'Oyly Carte and the only daughter of Rupert D'Oyly Carte.

Though as a child she was not enthusiastic about Gilbert and Sullivan, after her father's death in 1948 Bridget D'Oyly Carte inherited all her family's business interests, including the opera company, which performed year-round and controlled the copyrights to the joint works of W. S. Gilbert and Arthur Sullivan. She had begun to assist her father in managing the Savoy Hotel in 1933 and remained active in the hotel business, of which she was a major shareholder, until her death. She also undertook child welfare work.

Carte engaged Frederic Lloyd as general manager of the opera company in 1951 and took steps to keep the Savoy operas fresh, with new productions and redesigned costumes and scenery. After the copyrights to the Gilbert and Sullivan works expired in 1961, she transferred the company to the D'Oyly Carte Opera Trust, which she headed. In the 1970s, the company experienced mounting losses. These, together with the refusal of the Arts Council to provide a grant, forced the closure of the company in 1982, although it re-formed after Carte's death and mounted productions up to 2003. Since then, the Trust has co-produced several shows with Scottish Opera.

In 1972 Carte founded the D'Oyly Carte Charitable Trust to support charitable causes in the fields of the arts, medical welfare and the environment. She was created a DBE in 1975. With no children or surviving siblings, she was the end of her family line.

== Life and career ==
Bridget Cicely D'Oyly Carte was born at Suffolk Street, Pall Mall, London. Her father was Rupert D'Oyly Carte, and her mother was the former Lady Dorothy Milner Gathorne-Hardy (1889–1977), the youngest daughter of the 2nd Earl of Cranbrook. Her grandfather was Richard D'Oyly Carte, who founded the D'Oyly Carte Opera Company. All his children and grandchildren, including Bridget, were given his forename, D'Oyly. (Note: "D'Oyly" was not, as is sometimes thought, part of a double-barrelled surname. The name comes from Richard D'Oyly Carte's great-grandmother, Elizabeth D'Oyly, who was a descendant of Peregrine D'Oyly of Overbury Hall in Layham, Suffolk (c. 1625–1667).) She was educated privately in England and abroad.

In 1926, when she was 18, Carte married her first cousin, John Gathorne-Hardy, 4th Earl of Cranbrook. They soon separated and finally divorced in 1931; she relinquished her title and resumed her maiden name by deed poll in 1932, dropping the name Cicely, which she disliked. She then resumed her education, enrolling at Dartington Hall in Devon from 1931 to 1933, a school with a long musical tradition, taking courses in dance, teacher training, art and design. There she met the designer Peter Goffin who became a lifelong friend.

The death of her only brother, Michael (1911–1932), in a car crash made Carte the heir to her father's hotel and theatre interests; Michael had been expected to take over the family's businesses. As a child she had been reluctant to be part of the family's heritage. She later told The Gramophone magazine:

At home, you know, we weren't allowed to hum Gilbert and Sullivan; in fact we were fined for it, because it annoyed my father. We were allowed to sing it properly, but my brother and I couldn't. ... in my family the fact that I wasn't Mozart at about three years old was thought of as rather disappointing. So I went through a phase when I was very anti-Gilbert and Sullivan; I became rather a highbrow, and my father thought I was a bit of a snake-in-the-grass because of it.

From 1933 to 1939 Carte was an assistant to her father at the Savoy Hotel, taking responsibility for furnishing and interior decoration, for which she had training and aptitude. On the outbreak of the Second World War she undertook child welfare work and continued with it until her father's death in 1948. The family home was Coleton Fishacre, a house that her parents had built in Devon between Paignton and Kingswear in 1925. The house is still known for its design features and garden with exotic tropical plants.

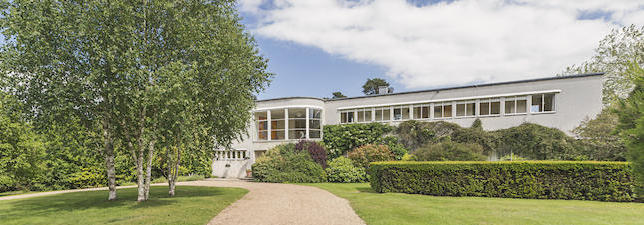
Shrubs Wood, Chalfont St Peter, Buckinghamshire – Carte's home from 1949

Shortly after Rupert's death Bridget sold Coleton Fishacre, which is now owned by the National Trust. In 1949 she bought Shrubs Wood, Chalfont St Peter, Buckinghamshire, an Art Deco country house designed by the architects Erich Mendelsohn and Serge Chermayeff. There she pursued her love of gardening and gave summer parties for disadvantaged or disabled children.

=== Managing the family interests ===
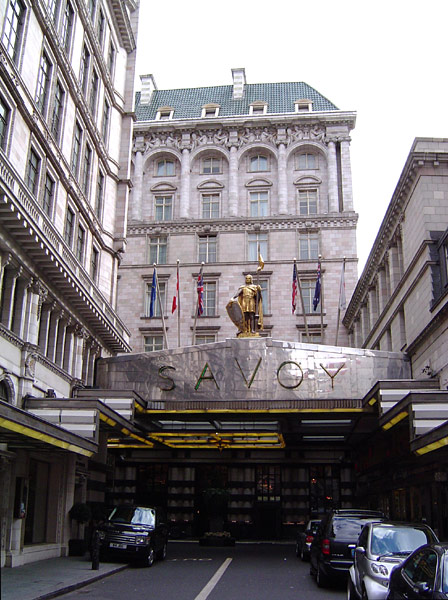
The Savoy Hotel

When Rupert D'Oyly Carte died in 1948, his daughter inherited all his interests including the Savoy Hotel group and the opera company, which presented the Savoy Operas from 1875 to 1982. In a 2020 history of the Savoy Hotel, Bridget D'Oyly Carte is described as "the reluctant heiress". She did not seek to succeed her father as chairman of the hotel group, in which she retained a large shareholding, but she became an active director. She moved into a suite in the Savoy Hotel and resumed control of the furnishing and decoration departments. In 1953 she was a member of the committee overseeing the decorations for the Coronation Ball at the Savoy Hotel in honour of the coronation of Queen Elizabeth II. (Note: The other members included Ninette de Valois, Vivien Leigh and Cecil Beaton.) When the Savoy Group acquired James Edwards, she took interest in the soft-furnishing company; she was also chairman of the royal florists, Edward Goodyear. She became vice-chairman of the Savoy Hotel Group in 1971 and was its president at the time of her death.

Looking back in 1962 at taking over the proprietorship of the opera company, Carte wrote:

I was the only member of my family left to carry on the tradition that my grandfather, Richard D'Oyly Carte, had started and to which Helen and my father had so successfully contributed. It was indeed a grave and serious moment for me and I did not feel in the least qualified to sustain the responsibility with which I was faced.

Nevertheless, she was determined to prove herself. One of her early decisions proved unpopular: the engagement as stage director of Eleanor Evans (Mrs Darrell Fancourt) in 1949. A former chorister and small role player, Evans alienated many company members and imposed rigid production methods, described by the principal comedian, Martyn Green, "as a stereotyped plan that results in a clockwork performance devoid of spontaneity". (Note: Evans's inflexibility and temperament were criticised by other company members, including Richard Walker, Kenneth Sandford, and Cynthia Morey.) He left at the end of the 1951 London season, as did Ella Halman, Richard Watson, Margaret Mitchell, Radley Flynn and twenty-two other artistes. The historian Tony Joseph writes, "It was the largest single exodus of performers in D'Oyly Carte history, and that was why the sense of sadness that hovered over the season was so marked. ... August 1951 was the end of an era". Evans retired as stage director in 1953, the year in which her husband died, but she was engaged to coach new D'Oyly Carte principals in their roles for some years thereafter. A longer-lasting and less contentious appointment made by Carte was the engagement of Frederic Lloyd as general manager of the opera company in 1951, in which position he remained until the company closed in 1982.

Programme for 1955 D'Oyly Carte tour of North America, with caricatures by Spy and Ape of Richard D'Oyly Carte, Arthur Sullivan and W. S. Gilbert

In running the company Carte took steps to keep the productions fresh, engaging a range of artists to redesign the costumes and scenery. Her old friend Goffin, who had previously redesigned The Yeomen of the Guard and Ruddigore for Rupert D'Oyly Carte, designed a unit set in 1957 to facilitate and reduce the cost of touring. He also produced new settings and costumes for Patience (1957), The Mikado (1958 – settings only, most of the celebrated Charles Ricketts costumes being retained), The Gondoliers (1958), Trial by Jury (1959), H.M.S. Pinafore (1961), and Iolanthe (1961). She commissioned new scenery or costumes, or both, from other designers for productions of Princess Ida (1954), The Gondoliers (1962 and 1968), The Sorcerer (1971), Utopia, Limited (1975) and Iolanthe (1977). The theatre historian C. M. P. Taylor, records, "Bridget D'Oyly Carte oversaw all new productions of the opera company with a keen eye for detail, especially in terms of their design. She claimed that the most important function of the operas, which in later years she advertised rather as musicals, was 'to bridge the generation gap and link serious music to pop'". She was generous with her time for researchers, and contributed prefaces and longer introductory chapters to books by numerous authors. (Note: Among the longest is Carte's introduction to Mander and Mitchenson's 1962 Picture History of Gilbert and Sullivan, a 3,500-word chapter giving an overview of the history of the family, the operas and the company.)

In 1950 Carte concluded an agreement with the film producer Alexander Korda giving him the right to use songs and scenes from the Savoy Operas; she co-operated in the making of his film, The Story of Gilbert and Sullivan (1953), giving the director and co-author advice and full access to Carte family documents.

Carte held the copyrights to the Savoy Operas, which were due to expire at the end of 1961. (Note: The copyrights to Sullivan's music had expired in 1950, which permitted use of it in new forms such as the ballet Pineapple Poll, but the British copyrights to Gilbert's words did not expire until the end of 1961, making productions of the Savoy Operas the continuing monopoly of the copyright holder – Bridget D'Oyly Carte – until then.) In 1958, concerned that this would enable other British producers to present the operas with alterations and without the traditional D'Oyly Carte staging, some Gilbert and Sullivan enthusiasts collected half a million signatures on a petition to parliament to extend the copyright and with it the D'Oyly Carte monopoly of the performance rights. Carte firmly dissociated herself from that campaign, and even considered disbanding the company when the copyright lapsed, but instead she instituted major changes to secure its future. In 1960 the company's own touring orchestra was formed to replace the ad hoc recruitment of players at each venue, and the following year Carte set up the charitable D'Oyly Carte Opera Trust to continue to present the operas. She endowed the trust with the company's scenery, costumes, band parts, recording rights and other assets, together with a cash endowment of £30,000. She formed Bridget D'Oyly Carte Ltd to manage the opera company, with herself as chairman and managing director.

Between 1964 and 1973 the D'Oyly Carte company televised and made films of some of the operas; (Note: An animated adaptation of Ruddigore, with soundtrack provided by the D'Oyly Carte's principals and chorus, went into production in 1964 and was released in 1967; Patience was televised in full during the 1965–66 London season; Bridget D'Oyly Carte gave an interval talk about the opera and the company; The Mikado was filmed in 1966, and an H.M.S. Pinafore film was made in 1973.) Carte engaged Sir Malcolm Sargent and Sir Charles Mackerras as guest conductors for some London seasons and promoted eight tours of North America between 1950 and 1978. In 1975 she presented a centenary season at the Savoy Theatre; (Note: Trial by Jury, the first Gilbert and Sullivan opera to be commissioned by Richard D'Oyly Carte, was premiered in 1875.) she made a rare public speech at the first night, alongside the then prime minister, Harold Wilson. in 1977 the company gave a Royal Command Performance at Windsor Castle, and in 1979, for the first time, toured Australia and New Zealand.

=== Later years ===
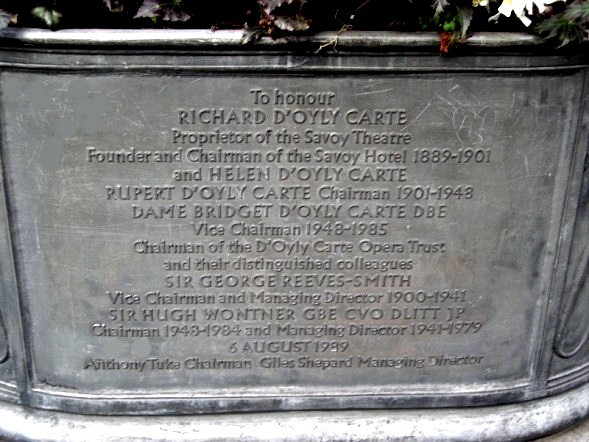
Planter in front of the Savoy Hotel in honour of Carte and her family

In 1972 Carte founded the D'Oyly Carte Charitable Trust – entirely separate from the D'Oyly Carte Opera Trust and the D'Oyly Carte Opera Company – supporting charitable causes in the fields of the arts, medical welfare and the environment. In 2001, the trust endowed the D'Oyly Carte Chair in Medicine and the Arts at King's College London with £2 million. In 1974 she was elected an Honorary Member of the Royal Society of Musicians of Great Britain, and in 1975 was created a DBE.

In the 1970s, Carte became the tenant of the semi-ruined Barscobe Castle, Balmaclellan, a small seventeenth-century fortified house in south-west Scotland, which she restored. Always shy, old-fashioned and formal, Carte appreciated simplicity and avoided parties and social events as much as possible. For her Who's Who entry she listed her recreations as, "country living and gardening; reading, theatre and music."

Rising costs led to mounting losses which, together with the refusal of the Arts Council to provide a grant, forced the closure of the D'Oyly Carte Opera Company in 1982. Even after it closed, however, the company's productions and style continued to influence the productions of other Gilbert and Sullivan companies around the world.

== Death and legacy ==
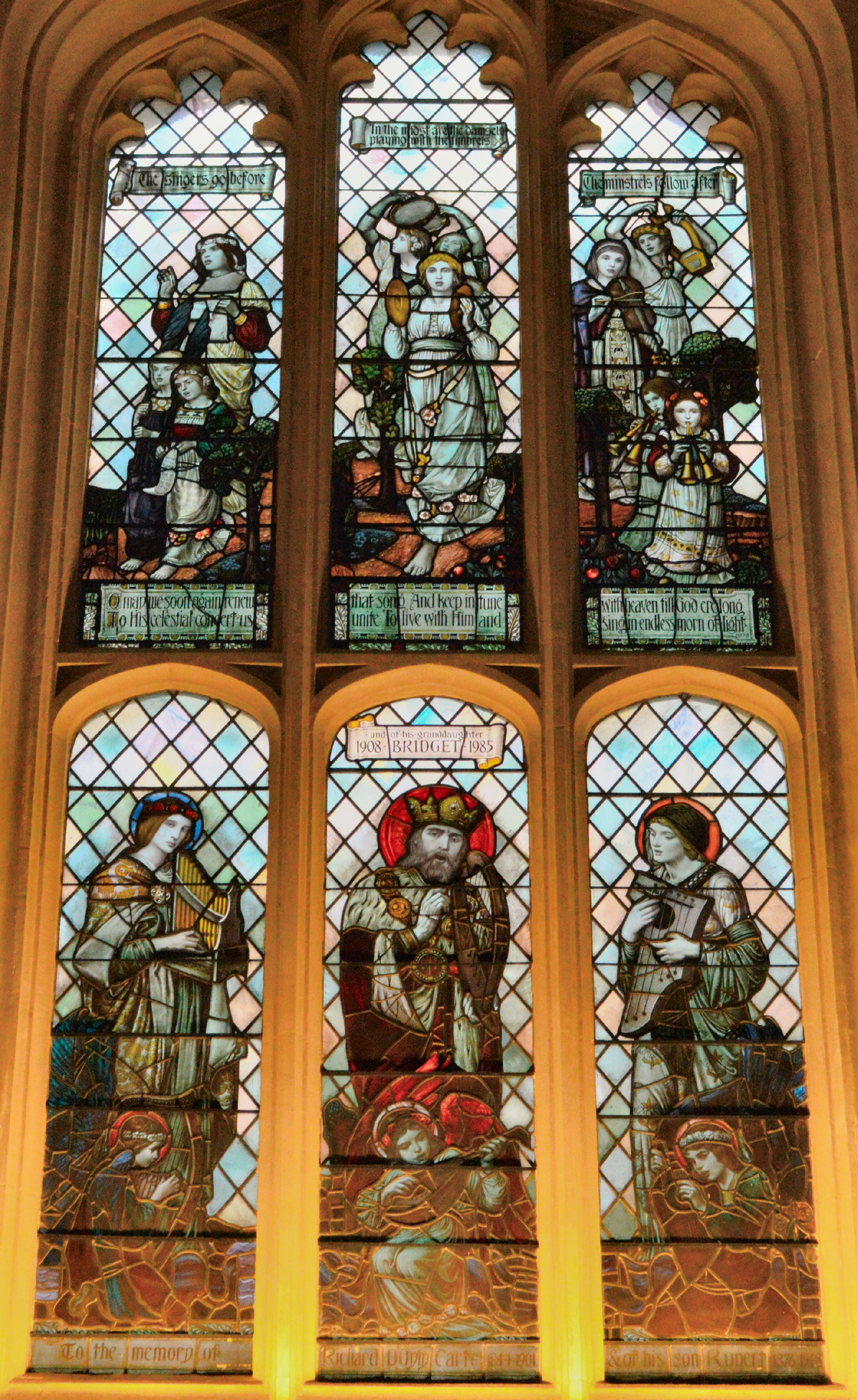
Memorial window to the Carte family in the Savoy Chapel, London. (Note: Originally dedicated to the memory of Richard and Rupert, Bridget's name was added (above King David in the lower central panel) after her death.)

A heavy smoker, Carte died of lung cancer at Shrubs Wood in 1985, aged 77. Her remains were cremated. She left a fortune of £5,479,888. With no children of her own or surviving siblings, she was the end of her family line. The Savoy Hotel group continued under the control of her trustees until 1994. The group's hotels remained among the most prestigious in London, with the London Evening Standard calling the Savoy "London's most famous hotel" in 2009.

A legacy of £1 million from her private fortune enabled a new opera company, using the D'Oyly Carte Opera Company name, to begin operations in 1988, though she left the bulk of her estate to other causes. From 1988 to 2003 the new company produced short seasons each year, mounting productions of the Gilbert and Sullivan operas on tour and in London, as well as operettas by Offenbach, Lehár and Johann Strauss. It did not employ many of the members of the original company and did not follow its performing traditions, even staging some "concept" productions of the operas. Once again, costs outran receipts, public subsidy was denied by the Arts Council, and the company suspended productions in May 2003. It continued to rent scores, and has participated in co-productions of Gilbert and Sullivan operas.

The Gilbert and Sullivan operas, nurtured by the Carte family for over a century, continue to be produced frequently today throughout the English-speaking world and beyond. By keeping the Savoy operas popular for so long, the Carte family influenced the course of the development of modern musical theatre throughout the 20th century.

== Notes, references and sources ==
=== Sources ===
- Bargainnier, Earl F. (1989). "W. S. Gilbert and American Musical Theatre". In Timothy E. Scheurer (ed.). American Popular Music: Readings from the Popular Press, Vol. 1. Bowling Green, OH: Bowling Green University Popular Press. ISBN 978-0-87972-466-5.
- Bradley, Ian (2005). Oh Joy! Oh Rapture! The Enduring Phenomenon of Gilbert and Sullivan. Oxford: Oxford University Press. ISBN 978-0-19-516700-9.
- Green, Martyn (1952). Here's a How-de-do. New York: W. W. Norton & Co. OCLC 884247.
- Jacobs, Arthur (1992) [1986]. Arthur Sullivan: A Victorian Musician (second ed.). Portland, Oregon: Amadeus Press. ISBN 978-0-931340-51-2.
- Jones, J. Bush (2003). Our Musicals, Ourselves. Lebanon, NH: Brandeis University Press. ISBN 978-1-58465-311-0.
- Joseph, Tony (1994). D'Oyly Carte Opera Company, 1875–1982: An Unofficial History. London: Bunthorne Books. ISBN 978-0-9507992-1-6.
- Mander, Raymond; Joe Mitchenson (1962). A Picture History of Gilbert and Sullivan. London: Vista Books. OCLC 317062414.
- Morey, Cynthia (1998). Inclined to Dance and Sing – A D'Oyly Carte journal of the 1950s. Chichester: Prospero Books. ISBN 978-1-902320-03-8.
- Morrell, Roberta (2009) [1999]. Kenneth Sandford – Merely Corroborative Detail (second ed.). Bloomington: Trafford. ISBN 978-1-4251-7829-1.
- Rollins, Cyril; R. John Witts (1962). The D'Oyly Carte Opera Company in Gilbert and Sullivan Operas. London: Michael Joseph, Ltd. OCLC 1317843. with four supplements published in 1966, 1971, 1976, and 1983, OCLC 225338750
- Seeley, Paul (2019). Richard D'Oyly Carte. London: Routledge. ISBN 978-1-351-04589-6.
- Williams, Olivia (2020). The Secret Life of the Savoy. London: Headline. ISBN 978-1-4722-6979-9.
- Wilson, Robin; Frederic Lloyd (1984). Gilbert & Sullivan – The D'Oyly Carte Years. London: Weidenfeld and Nicolson. ISBN 978-0-297-78505-7.
