= Rupert D'Oyly Carte =

British theatre manager and hotelier (1876–1948)

Rupert D'Oyly Carte, c. 1910

Rupert D'Oyly Carte (3 November 1876 – 12 September 1948) was an English hotelier, theatre owner and impresario, best known as proprietor of the D'Oyly Carte Opera Company and Savoy Hotel from 1913 to 1948.

Son of the impresario and hotelier Richard D'Oyly Carte, Rupert inherited the family businesses from his stepmother Helen. After serving in the First World War, he took steps to revitalise the opera company, which had not appeared in central London since 1909, hiring new designers and conductors to present fresh productions of the Gilbert and Sullivan operas in seasons in the West End. The new productions generally retained the original text and music of the operas. Carte launched international and provincial tours, as well as the London seasons, and he released the first complete recordings of the operas. He also rebuilt the half-century-old Savoy Theatre in 1929, opening the house with a season of Gilbert and Sullivan.

As an hotelier, Carte built on his father's legacy, expanding the Savoy Hotel, refreshing the other hotels and restaurants in the Savoy group, including Claridge's and the Berkeley Hotel, and introducing cabaret and dance bands that became internationally famous. He also increased marketing activities, including foreign marketing, of the hotels.

P. G. Wodehouse based a character in his novels, Psmith, on a Wykehamist schoolboy whom he identified as Rupert D'Oyly Carte. At his death, Carte passed the opera company and hotels to his only surviving child, Bridget D'Oyly Carte. The Gilbert and Sullivan operas, nurtured by Carte and his family for over a century, continue to be produced frequently today throughout the English-speaking world and beyond.

== Life and career ==
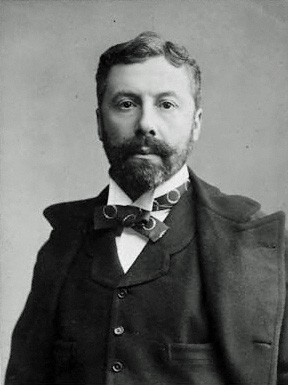
Rupert's father, Richard D'Oyly Carte

=== Early life ===
Rupert D'Oyly Carte was born in Hampstead, London, the younger son of the impresario Richard D'Oyly Carte and his first wife Blanche (née Prowse), who died in 1885. Like his elder brother, Lucas (1872–1907), he was given his father's middle name. He was educated at Winchester College, noted as among the most intellectually rigorous of English public schools. (Note: One biographical sketch of Carte states that after Winchester he went to Magdalen College, Oxford, like his brother, but there is no mention of the latter in Carte’s Who's Who entry or his obituaries.) He then worked for a firm of accountants before joining his father as an assistant in 1894. In a newspaper interview given in the year of his death, Rupert recalled that as a young man he was entrusted, during his father's illness, with helping W. S. Gilbert with the first revival of The Yeomen of the Guard at the Savoy Theatre. (Note: The newspaper report states that this was when he was 22, but the first revival of The Yeomen was in May 1897, when Rupert D'Oyly Carte was only 20.)

He was elected a director of the Savoy Hotel Limited in 1898, joining his father and Sir Arthur Sullivan, who had served on the board since the Savoy Hotel was built. By 1899 he was assistant managing director. Richard D'Oyly Carte died in 1901, and Rupert's stepmother, the former Helen Lenoir, who had married Richard in 1888, assumed full control of most of the family businesses, which she had increasingly controlled during her husband's decline. Rupert's brother, Lucas, a barrister, was not involved in the family businesses and died of tuberculosis, aged 34. (Note: Lucas was born on 27 December 1872 and educated at Winchester College and then Magdalen College, Oxford. He was called to the bar in 1897 and was appointed private secretary to Lord Chief Justice Charles Russell in 1899. After he contracted tuberculosis, he worked for the rest of his life on issues relating to the disease and died on 18 January 1907.)

=== Taking over the family businesses ===
In 1903, at the age of 27, Rupert took over his late father's role as chairman of the Savoy group, which included the Savoy Hotel, Claridge's, the Berkeley Hotel, Simpson's-in-the-Strand and the Grand Hotel in Rome. At this time, the whole group was officially valued at £2,221,708. He immediately issued £300,000 of debentures to raise capital for a large extension to the Savoy (the "East Block"). Like his father, Carte was willing to go to great lengths to secure the best employees for his hotels. When Claridge's needed a new chef in 1904, he secured the services of François Bonnaure, formerly chef at the Élysée Palace in Paris. The press speculated on how much Carte must have paid to persuade Bonnaure to join him, and compared the younger Carte's audacity with his father's coup in securing Paris's most famous maître d'hôtel, M. Joseph, a few years earlier.

Carte in 1919

Between 1906 and 1909 Helen Carte, (Note: Helen married Stanley Boulter in 1902, but was generally still known as "Carte" or "D'Oyly Carte" in business.) Rupert's stepmother, staged two repertory seasons at the Savoy Theatre. Directed by Gilbert and received with much success, they revitalised the D'Oyly Carte Opera Company, which had been in decline after Richard D'Oyly Carte's death. In 1912, when theatre censorship was under discussion in Britain, Carte was strongly in favour of retaining censorship, because it gave managements complete certainty about what they could or could not stage without fear of interference by the police or others. He joined with other London theatre managers, including Herbert Beerbohm Tree, George Edwardes and Arthur Bourchier in signing a petition for the retention of censorship. In the same year, together with Herbert Sullivan and theatre managers including Beerbohm Tree and Squire Bancroft, Carte was an instigator of a memorial to W. S. Gilbert at Charing Cross. In 1913, Rupert's stepmother Helen died. She left all her holdings in the Savoy Hotel group, the Savoy Theatre and the D'Oyly Carte Opera Company to her stepson.

=== Revitalising the D'Oyly Carte Opera Company ===
After London seasons in 1906–07 and 1908–09, the opera company did not perform in the West End again until 1919, although it continued to tour in Great Britain. (Note: The company toured for eleven months a year. Its outer London engagements in these years were in Camden Town, Clapham, Crystal Palace, Deptford, Fulham, Hammersmith, Holloway, Kennington, New Cross, Notting Hill, Peckham, Richmond, Stratford, Wimbledon and Woolwich.) According to the theatre writer H. M. Walbrook, "Through the years of the Great War they continued to be on tour through the country, drawing large and grateful audiences everywhere. They helped to sustain the spirits of the people during that stern period, and by so doing they helped to win the victory." Nevertheless, Carte later recalled, "I went and watched the Company playing at a rather dreary theatre down in the suburbs of London. I thought the dresses looked dowdy . . . I formed the view that new productions should be prepared, with scenery and dresses to the design of first class artists who understood the operas but who would produce a décor attractive to the new generation." In a 1922 memoir, Henry Lytton, having admired Richard D'Oyly Carte's keen eye for stagecraft, added, "That 'eye' for stagecraft ... has been inherited in a quite remarkable degree by his son, Mr. Rupert D'Oyly Carte. He, too, has the gift of taking in the details of a scene at a glance, and knowing instinctively just what must be corrected". In 1910 the company engaged J. M. Gordon as stage manager, and Carte promoted him to stage director in 1922. Under Carte's supervision Gordon preserved the company's traditions in exacting detail for 28 years.

Souvenir programme cover: 1919–20 season

During the First World War Carte served in the Royal Navy, and his plans for reviving the operas in London proceeded slowly. (Note: Carte was a King's Messenger; in his The Gilbert and Sullivan Book, Leslie Baily writes, "Carte was on special duties in the Navy: he would be sent off on secret journeys to distant parts of the world, and he would mysteriously reappear in London for a few weeks, and when he did so he would put in a few touches to the preparatory work for the rebirth of the D'Oyly Carte Opera Company." Bridget D'Oyly Carte later commented that the war created a break in continuity that both Helen Carte and Gilbert had believed necessary if the operas were to be successfully revived in the West End.) By the end of the war he had reorganised the whole structure of the opera company, assembled new artists and staff and had planned the redressing and restaging of many of the operas. After the war he put his plans into effect. In an interview in The Observer in August 1919 he set out his policy for staging the operas: "They will be played precisely in their original form, without any alteration to the words, or any attempt to bring them up to date." This uncompromising declaration was modified in a later interview in which he said, "the plays are all being restaged ... Gilbert's words will be unaltered, though there will be some freshness in the method of rendering them. Artists must have scope for their individuality, and new singers cannot be tied down to imitate slavishly those who made successes in the old days."

Carte's first London season, at the Prince's Theatre, 1919–20, featured ten of the thirteen extant Gilbert and Sullivan operas. It did not include Ruddigore, Utopia, Limited or The Grand Duke. Princess Ida had its first London performances since the original 1883 production. (Note: In a last-night speech at the end of the 1924 London season, Carte said that he hoped to revive Utopia, Limited in 1925. The opera was not, however, revived until 1975.) The new productions retained the text and music of the original 1870s and 1880s productions, and Gordon preserved much of Gilbert's original direction. As his father and stepmother had done, Carte licensed the operas to the J. C. Williamson company and to amateur groups, but he required all licensees to present them in approved productions that closely followed the libretto, score and D'Oyly Carte production stagings. In an interview with The Times in 1922, Carte said that the Savoy "tradition" was an expression that was frequently misunderstood: "It did not by any means imply any hidebound stage 'business' or an attempt to standardize the performances of artists so as to check their individual method of expression. All that it implied, in his view, was the highest possible standard of production – with especial attention to clear enunciation . . . Many people seemed to think that Gilbert believed in absolutely set methods but this was not by any means the case. He did not hesitate to alter productions when they were revived."

Although he had told the press that the original words and music would not be altered, Carte was willing to make changes in certain cases. In 1919–20, he authorised cuts and alterations in both Princess Ida and Ruddigore. In 1921 Cox and Box was produced in an extensively cut-down version, to allow it to be played as a companion piece with the shortest of the two-act Savoy operas. He also authorised changes to Gilbert's text: he wrote to The Times in 1948: "We found recently in America that much objection was taken by coloured persons to a word used twice in The Mikado." The word in question was Gilbert's reference to "nigger" (blackface) minstrels, and Carte asked A. P. Herbert to suggest an acceptable revision. "He made several alternative suggestions, one of which we adopted in America, and it seems well to go on doing so in the British Empire." A similar reference in Princess Ida was also altered.

1921 cartoon: D'Oyly Carte audiences

Carte commissioned new costumes and scenery throughout his proprietorship of the company. He engaged Charles Ricketts to redesign The Gondoliers and The Mikado, the costumes for the latter, created in 1926, being retained by all the company's subsequent designers. Other redesigns were by Percy Anderson, Atillio Comelli, George Sheringham, Hugo Rumbold and Peter Goffin, a protégé of Carte's daughter, Bridget.

For London seasons, Carte often engaged guest conductors, first Geoffrey Toye, then Malcolm Sargent, who examined Sullivan's manuscript scores and purged the orchestral parts of accretions. So striking was the orchestral sound produced by Sargent that the press thought he had retouched the scores, and Carte had the pleasant duty of correcting their error. In a letter to The Times, he noted that "the details of the orchestration sounded so fresh that some of the critics thought them actually new ... the opera was played last night exactly as written by Sullivan." Carte also engaged Harry Norris, who started with the touring company, and then was Toye's assistant before becoming musical director. Isidore Godfrey joined the company as assistant musical director in 1925 and became musical director in 1929, remaining in that post until 1968.

Major-General's Song
George Baker sings the "I am the very model of a modern Major-General", conducted by George W. Byng (1920)

The possibilities of the gramophone appealed to Carte. After the First World War he supervised a series of complete recordings of the scores of the operas on the His Master's Voice label, beginning with The Mikado in 1918. (Note: Recordings of Gilbert and Sullivan songs had been made as early as the 1890s, and there were several complete or nearly-complete operas recorded in the early years of the twentieth century, not under D'Oyly Carte auspices.) The first nine His Master's Voice sets, made between 1918 and 1925, were recorded by the early acoustic process. At first, guest singers were chosen who were known for their ability to record well in this technology. Later in this series, more of the regular members of the company were featured. With the introduction of electrical recording and its greatly improved recording process and sound, a new round of recordings began in 1927. For the electrical series, Carte's own singers were mostly used. Carte also recognised the potential of radio and worked with the BBC to relay live broadcasts of D'Oyly Carte productions. A 1926 relay of part of a Savoy Theatre performance of The Mikado was heard by up to eight million people. The London Evening Standard noted that this was "probably the largest audience that has ever heard anything at one time in the history of the world." Under Carte, the company continued to make broadcasts during the interwar years. In 1932, The Yeomen of the Guard became the first Gilbert and Sullivan opera to be broadcast in its entirety.

=== Rebuilding the Savoy Theatre and later years ===
With his opera company at the end of its 1926 London season: front row, from left: Bertha Lewis, Carte, Lady Gilbert, Lytton, Lady Dorothy Carte (in profile), Winifred Lawson, Darrell Fancourt and Aileen Davies. Behind Lewis: Eleanor Evans; behind Lytton: Leo Sheffield and Sargent.

In 1929 Carte had the 48-year-old Savoy Theatre rebuilt and modernised. It closed on 3 June 1929 and was gutted and completely rebuilt to designs by Frank A. Tugwell with décor by Basil Ionides. The old house had three tiers; the new one had two. The seating capacity (which had decreased to 986 from its original 1,292) was restored nearly completely, to 1,200. The theatre reopened 135 days later on 21 October 1929, with The Gondoliers, designed by Ricketts and conducted by Sargent. The critic Ernest Newman wrote, "I can imagine no gayer or more exhilarating frame for the Gilbert and Sullivan operas than the Savoy as it is now."

Despite its historical connection with Gilbert and Sullivan, most of Carte's London seasons were staged not at the Savoy but at two larger houses: the Prince's (now the Shaftesbury) Theatre (1919–20, 1921–22, 1924, 1926, 1942 and Sadler's Wells (1935, 1936, 1937, 1939, 1947 and 1948). His three Savoy Theatre seasons were in 1929–30, 1932–33, and 1941. In addition to year-round UK tours, Carte mounted tours of North America in 1927, 1928–29, 1934–35, 1936–37, 1939 and 1947–48). During the 1936 tour an American critic wrote, "If there were only some way of keeping them on this side permanently. I humbly suggest to the New Deal that it cancel England's war debt in exchange for the D'Oyly Cartians. We should be much the gainer."

Carte was deeply affected by the death of his son Michael in 1932. The actor Martyn Green said, "The heart dropped right out of him. His interest in both the operas and the hotel seemed to fade away." Nevertheless, in 1934 the company made a highly successful eight-month North American tour with Green as its new principal comedian, replacing Lytton. Carte gave approval for, and was closely consulted about, a 1938 film version of The Mikado produced and conducted by Geoffrey Toye, starring Green and released by Universal Pictures, but his only new stage production after 1932 was of The Yeomen of the Guard designed in 1939 by Peter Goffin. The re-staging was regarded as radical, but when Goffin took fright at the storm of controversy, Carte told him, "I don't care what they say about the production. I should care if they said nothing."

On 3 September 1939, at the outbreak of the Second World War, the British government ordered the immediate and indefinite closure of all theatres. Carte cancelled the autumn tour and disbanded the company. Theatres were permitted to reopen from 15 September, but it took some weeks to re-form the company. It resumed touring in Edinburgh on Christmas Day 1939, and continued to perform throughout the war. German bombing destroyed the sets and costumes for five D'Oyly Carte productions: Cox and Box, The Sorcerer, H.M.S. Pinafore, Princess Ida and Ruddigore. The old productions of Pinafore and Cox and Box were recreated shortly after the war, but the other two operas took longer to rejoin the company's repertory. (Note: Pinafore re-entered the repertory in July 1947, Cox and Box in the 1947–48 season, Ruddigore in November 1948, and Princess Ida in September 1954. The Sorcerer was not revived until April 1971.) Goffin designed and directed the new production of The Yeomen of the Guard first seen in January 1940, and his new Ruddigore debuted in 1948, shortly after Carte's death. A return of the company to the US for 21 weeks in 1947 was very successful.

=== Savoy Hotel group ===
From the beginning of his career, Carte maintained the Savoy group in London, disposing in 1919 of the Grand Hotel, Rome, which his father had acquired in 1896. In the 1920s, he ensured that the Savoy continued to attract a fashionable clientele by a continuous programme of modernisation and the introduction of dancing in the large restaurants. The Savoy Orpheans and the Savoy Havana Band were described in The Times as "probably the best-known bands in Europe". In 1927 Carte appointed his opera company's general manager, Richard Collet, to run the cabaret at the Savoy, which began in April 1929.

Until the 1930s, the Savoy group had not thought it necessary to advertise, but Carte and his manager George Reeves-Smith changed their approach. Reeves-Smith told The Times, "We are endeavouring by intensive propaganda work to get more customers; this work is going on in the U.S.A., in Canada, in the Argentine and in Europe." Towards the end of the Second World War, Carte added to the Savoy group the bombed-out site near Leicester Square of Stone's Chop House, the freehold of which he purchased with a view to reopening the restaurant there on the lines of the group's Simpson's-in-the-Strand. The revived Stone's reopened after his death.

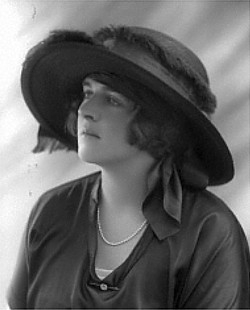
Lady Dorothy Carte circa 1910

=== Personal life ===
In 1907, Carte married Lady Dorothy Milner Gathorne-Hardy (1889–1977), the third and youngest daughter of the 2nd Earl of Cranbrook, with whom he had a daughter, Bridget, and a son, Michael (1911–1932). Michael was killed at the age of 21 in a motor accident in Switzerland. In 1925, Carte and his wife had a country house built for them in Kingswear, Devon named Coleton Fishacre. The house is still known for its design features and garden with exotic tropical plants. After her parents' divorce, Bridget D'Oyly Carte took over the house, which her father, who lived in London, would visit for long weekends. She sold the house after his death, and it is now owned by the National Trust.

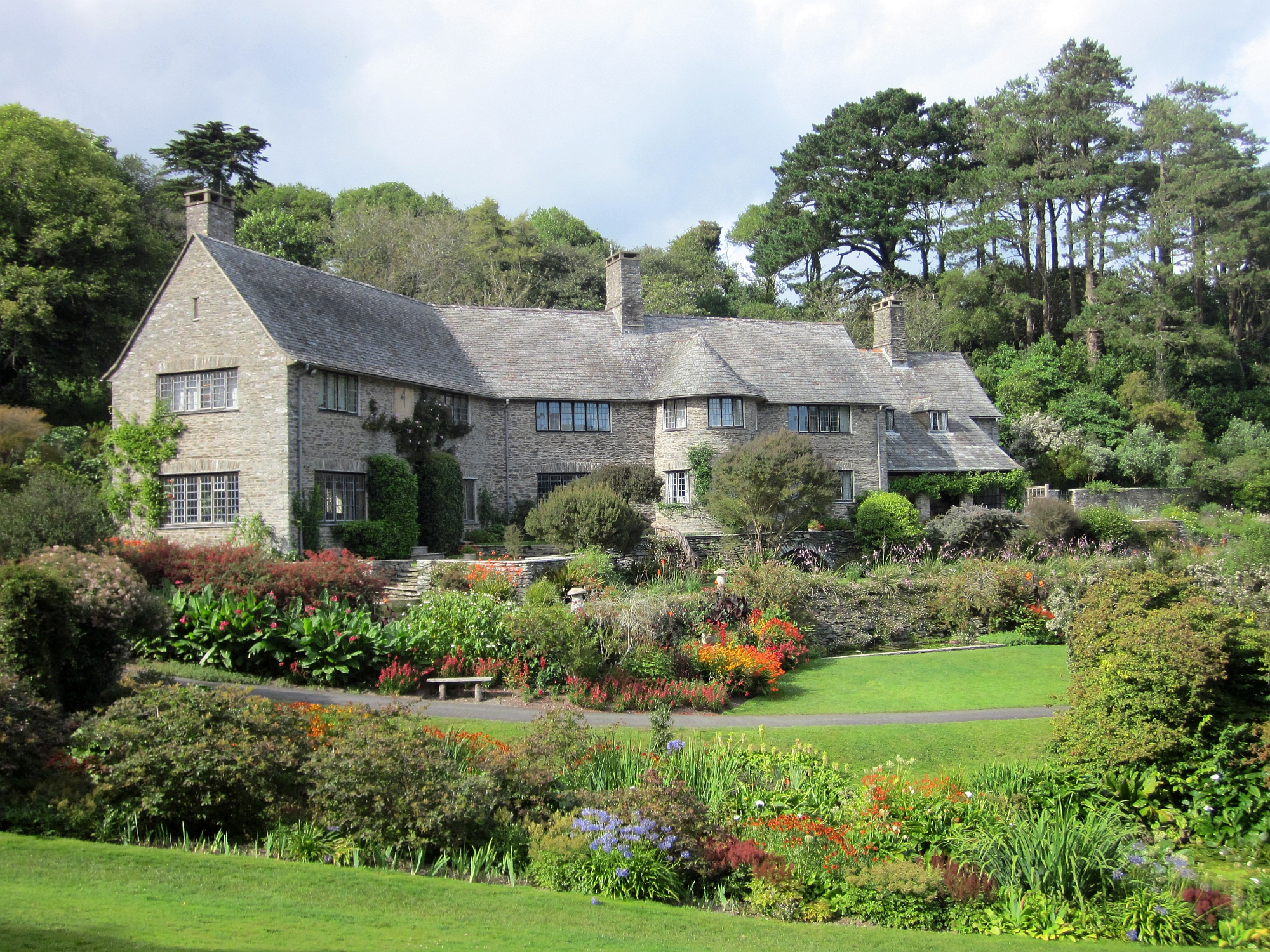
Carte's House at Coleton Fishacre

Carte's private pastimes included gardening, notably at Coleton Fishacre, driving and yachting. He was an early devotee of the motor car and incurred the displeasure of the courts more than once. He was fined £3 for driving at 19 miles an hour in 1902, and the following year he was subject to criminal prosecution for knocking down and injuring a child when driving at the speed of 24 miles an hour. He made "every provision for the comfort of the child", who recovered from the accident. In the years after the First World War he was a frequent competitor in yachting races. From 1919 he raced his yacht Kali in the Hamble River class. Later, he owned and raced a 19-ton cutter, Content.

In 1941, Carte divorced his wife for adultery. The suit was undefended. Lady Dorothy moved to the island of Tobago and married St Yves de Verteuil, who had been the co-respondent in the divorce case. De Verteuil died in 1963, and Lady Dorothy de Verteuil died on 21 February 1977. (Note: Lady Dorothy met Verteuil in Trinidad and Tobago in the early 1930s and moved there to live with him in 1933. Her life there is explored in the 2020 book Deep Indigo: Lady Dorothy D'Oyly Carte and St. Yves de Verteuil in Tobago: 1933–1978 by Elizabeth Cadiz Topp.)

P. G. Wodehouse's Psmith, said to be modelled on Carte

P. G. Wodehouse based the character Psmith, seen in several of his comic novels, on either Rupert D'Oyly Carte or his elder brother Lucas. In the introduction to his novel Something Fresh, Wodehouse says that Psmith (originally named Rupert, then Ronald) was "based more or less faithfully on Rupert D'Oyly Carte, son of the Savoy theatre man. He was at school with a cousin of mine, and my cousin happened to tell me about his monocle, his immaculate clothes and his habit, when asked by a master how he was, of replying, 'Sir, I grow thinnah and thinnah'." (Note: The character Psmith appears in several novels: Mike (1909), revised in two volumes as Enter Psmith (1935) and Mike and Psmith (1953), Psmith in the City (1910), Psmith, Journalist (1915) and Leave it to Psmith (1923).) Bridget D'Oyly Carte, however, believed that the Wykehamist schoolboy described to Wodehouse was not her father but his brother Lucas, who was also at Winchester College. Rupert D'Oyly Carte was "shy, reserved and at times distinctly taciturn." Psmith, by contrast, is outgoing and garrulous. (Note: "Don't talk so much! I never met a fellow like you for talking!", another character says to Psmith.)

=== Death and legacy ===
Carte died at the Savoy Hotel, after a brief illness, at the age of 71. A memorial service was held for him at the Savoy Chapel on 23 September 1948. His ashes were scattered on the headland at Coleton Fishacre. He left an estate valued at £288,436. At his death, the family businesses passed to his daughter, Bridget D'Oyly Carte. The Savoy hotel group remained under the control of the Carte family and its associates until 1994. Carte's hotels have remained among the most prestigious in London, with the London Evening Standard calling the Savoy "London's most famous hotel" in 2009.

The year after Carte's death, the opera company, which had been the personal possession of Richard, Helen and Carte, became a private company, of which Bridget retained a controlling interest and was chairman and managing director. She inherited a company in strong condition, but the rising costs of mounting professional light opera without any government support eventually became unsustainable, and she closed the company in 1982. The Gilbert and Sullivan operas, nurtured by Carte and his family for over a century, continue to be produced frequently today throughout the English-speaking world and beyond. By keeping the Savoy operas popular throughout the mid-20th century, Carte continued to influence the course of the development of modern musical theatre.

== Notes, references and sources ==
=== Sources ===
- Ainger, Michael (2002). Gilbert and Sullivan – A Dual Biography. Oxford: Oxford University Press. ISBN 978-0-19-514769-8.
- Baily, Leslie (1966) [1956]. The Gilbert and Sullivan Book (second ed.). London: Spring Books. OCLC 3651931.
- Bargainnier, Earl F. (1989). "W. S. Gilbert and American Musical Theatre". American Popular Music: Readings from the Popular Press. Timothy E. Scheurer (ed). Bowling Green, Ohio: Bowling Green State University Press. ISBN 978-0-87972-466-5.
- Bettany, Clemence (1975). D'Oyly Carte Centenary. London: D'Oyly Carte Opera Company. OCLC 910206945.
- Bishop, Thomas J. H. (1967). Winchester and the Public School Elite: A Statistical Analysis. London: Faber. OCLC 192786.
- Bradley, Ian (2005). Oh Joy! Oh Rapture! The Enduring Phenomenon of Gilbert and Sullivan. Oxford University Press. ISBN 978-0-19-516700-9.
- Bradley, Ian (2016). The Complete Annotated Gilbert and Sullivan. New York: Oxford University Press. ISBN 978-0-19-939242-1.
- Carte, Bridget D'Oyly (1962). "Foreword". A Picture History of Gilbert and Sullivan. Raymond Mander and Joe Mitchenson. London: Vista Books. OCLC 977472724.
- Donaldson, Frances (1983). P. G. Wodehouse. London: Weidenfeld and Nicolson. ISBN 978-0-7088-2356-9.
- Green, Martyn (1952). Here's a How-de-do. New York: W. W. Norton & Co. OCLC 637068390.
- Jones, J. Bush (2003). Our Musicals, Ourselves. Lebanon, New Hampshire: Brandeis University Press. ISBN 978-1-58465-311-0.
- Jones, Nigel (2004). Mosley. London: Haus. ISBN 978-1-904341-08-6.
- Joseph, Tony (1994). D'Oyly Carte Opera Company, 1875–1982: An Unofficial History. London: Bunthorne Books. ISBN 978-0-9507992-1-6.
- Lytton, Henry (1922). Secrets of a Savoyard. London: Jarrold. OCLC 1069586939.
- Reid, Charles (1968). Malcolm Sargent: a biography. London: Hamish Hamilton Ltd. ISBN 978-0-241-91316-1.
- Rollins, Cyril; R. John Witts (1962). The D'Oyly Carte Opera Company in Gilbert and Sullivan Operas: A Record of Productions, 1875–1961. London: Michael Joseph. OCLC 504581419.
- Usborne, Richard (1976). Wodehouse at Work to the End (second ed.). London: Barrie and Jenkins. ISBN 978-0-214-20211-7.
- Walbrook, H. M. (1922). Gilbert & Sullivan Opera, A History and a Comment, Chapter 16. London: F. V. White. OCLC 3303311.
- Wilson, Robin; Frederic Lloyd (1984). Gilbert & Sullivan – The Official D'Oyly Carte Picture History. London: Weidenfeld and Nicolson. ISBN 978-0-297-78505-7.
