= Peter Goffin =

English set and costume designer (1906–1974)

Peter Goffin F.R.S.A. (28 February 1906 – 22 March 1974), was an English set and costume designer and stage manager, known for his work with the D'Oyly Carte Opera Company.

== Biography ==
Goffin was born in Plymouth, England, the son of Willam Earl Goffin and Elizabeth Goffin, née Underwood. From 1922 to 1930 he worked as an interior decorator and mural painter locally. As a young man, he was taken on by the local repertory theatre in Plymouth as a designer, going on to Dartington Hall from 1931 to 1934 where he took over responsibility for staging, costumes and lighting of the Dance-Drama Group. In 1935 and 1936 he was resident director at the Barn Theatre, Chesham Bois, Buckinghamshire.

In 1936, Goffin went to the Westminster Theatre in London, working with Harley Granville Barker and Michael MacOwan on a range of productions, from classics such as Volpone, Uncle Vanya and Troilus and Cressida, to modern works including Mourning Becomes Electra, Heartbreak House, and T. S. Eliot's The Family Reunion. In 1938 Goffin was invited by the government to supervise a course on stagecraft and to lecture on the subject.

During his Dartington days, Goffin met Bridget D'Oyly Carte. She introduced him to her father, Rupert, who commissioned Goffin to redesign the D'Oyly Carte Opera Company's production of The Yeomen of the Guard in 1938. Goffin's new set caused dissent among traditionalists because it did not depict the familiar backdrop of the White Tower. Martyn Green, the reigning principal comedian, was far from happy with his new costume, and he implied in his memoirs that it was one of the reasons why he later left the company.

For Rupert and later Bridget D'Oyly Carte, he designed new sets and costumes for Ruddigore (1948), Patience (1957), The Mikado (1958 – sets only, most of the celebrated Charles Ricketts costumes being retained), The Gondoliers (1958), Trial by Jury (1959), H.M.S. Pinafore (1961), and Iolanthe (1961). He also created a unit set – a framework on which the sets for each opera could easily be interchanged, which, according to Frederic Lloyd, the General Manager of the D'Oyly Carte Company, "saved the management an enormous amount of expense and facilitated taking more operas to more theatres." In addition, Goffin designed a number of posters and other graphic art for the D'Oyly Carte organisation.

Goffin wrote books including Stage Lighting (1938), The Realm of Art (1946), Stage Lighting For Amateurs (1947) and The art and science of stage management (1953). His The Realm of Art, and his meeting Leon MacLaren, led the School of Economic Science to begin teaching philosophy; Goffin later presented their early public philosophy lectures. He was elected a Fellow of the Royal Society of Arts in 1948.

He was married to Margaret Wallace Dale. Goffin died in Buckinghamshire at the age of 68.
