= D'Oyly Carte Opera Company =

British theatre company

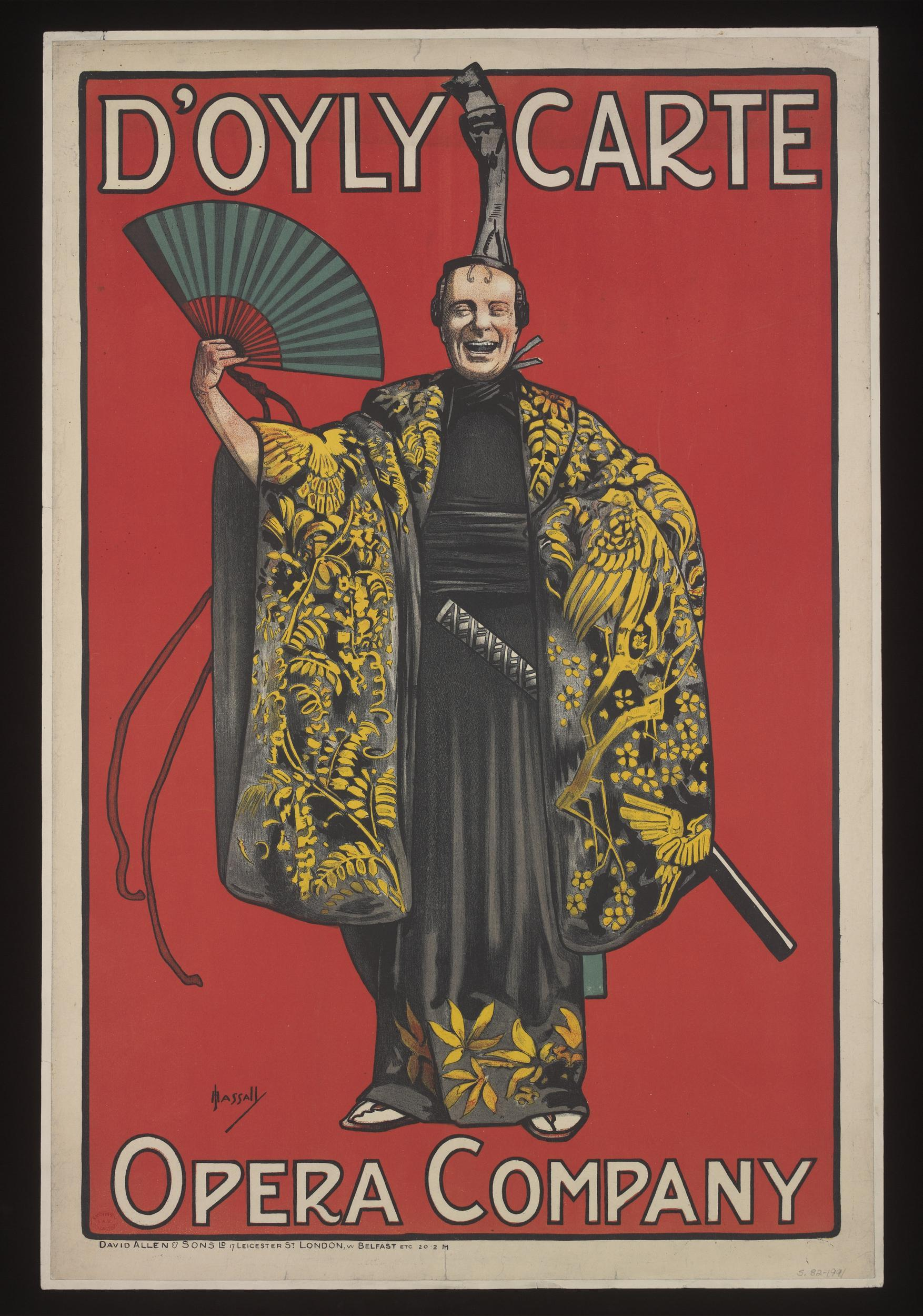
Theatre poster for The Mikado

The D'Oyly Carte Opera Company was a professional British light opera company that, from the 1870s until 1982, staged Gilbert and Sullivan's Savoy operas nearly year-round in the UK and sometimes toured in Europe, North America and elsewhere. The company was revived for short seasons and tours from 1988 to 2003.

In 1875, Richard D'Oyly Carte asked the dramatist W. S. Gilbert and the composer Arthur Sullivan to collaborate on a short comic opera to round out an evening's entertainment. When that work, Trial by Jury, became a success, Carte put together a syndicate to produce a full-length Gilbert and Sullivan work, The Sorcerer (1877), followed by H.M.S. Pinafore (1878). After Pinafore became an international sensation, Carte jettisoned his difficult investors and formed a new partnership with Gilbert and Sullivan that became the D'Oyly Carte Opera Company. The company produced the succeeding ten Gilbert and Sullivan operas and many other operas and companion pieces, mostly at the Savoy Theatre in London, which Carte built in 1881 for that purpose. The company also mounted tours in Britain, New York and elsewhere, usually running several companies simultaneously. Carte's able assistant, Helen Lenoir, became his wife in 1888 and, after his death in 1901, she ran the company until her own death in 1913. By this time, it had become a year-round Gilbert and Sullivan touring repertory company.

Carte's son Rupert inherited the company. Beginning in 1919, he mounted new seasons in London with new set and costume designs, while continuing the year-round tours in Britain and abroad. With the help of the director J. M. Gordon and the conductor Isidore Godfrey, Carte ran the company for 35 years. He redesigned the Savoy Theatre in 1928 and sponsored a series of recordings over the years that helped to keep the operas popular. After Rupert's death in 1948, his daughter Bridget inherited the company and hired Frederic Lloyd as general manager. The company continued to tour for 35 weeks each year, issue new recordings and play London seasons of Gilbert and Sullivan. In 1961 the last copyright on the Gilbert and Sullivan operas expired, and Bridget set up and endowed a charitable trust that presented the operas until mounting costs and a lack of public funding forced the closure of the company in 1982. It re-formed in 1988 with a legacy left by Bridget D'Oyly Carte, played short tours and London seasons, and issued some popular recordings. Denied significant funding from the English Arts Council, it ended productions in 2003. Bridget D'Oyly Carte formed The D'Oyly Carte Opera Trust which, since the closing of the company, has co-produced, with Scottish Opera, The Pirates of Penzance in 2013, The Mikado in 2016, The Gondoliers and Utopia, Limited in 2021–22, and Trial by Jury in 2025.

Some of the company's performers, over the decades, became stars of their day and often moved on to careers in musical theatre or grand opera. The company licensed the operas for performance in Australasia and to numerous amateur troupes in Britain and elsewhere, providing orchestra parts and prompt books for hire. The company kept the Savoy operas in the public eye for over a century and left an enduring legacy of production styles and stage business that continue to be emulated in new productions, as well as recordings.

== History ==
=== Beginnings ===
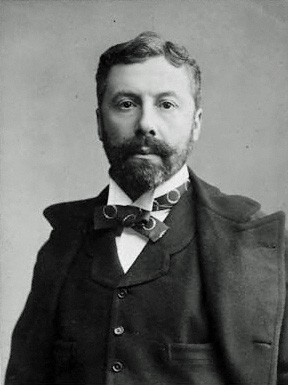
Richard D'Oyly Carte

By 1874, Richard D'Oyly Carte, a musician and ambitious young impresario, had begun producing operettas in London. He announced his ambitions on the front of the programme for one of his productions that year: "It is my desire to establish in London a permanent abode for light opera." The Observer reported, "Mr D'Oyly Carte is not only a skilful manager, but a trained musician, and he appears to have grasped the fact that the public are beginning to become weary of what is known as a genuine opera bouffe, and are ready to welcome a musical entertainment of a higher order, such as a musician might produce with satisfaction". He wanted to establish a body of tasteful English comic opera that would appeal to families, in contrast to the bawdy burlesques and adaptations of French operettas and opera bouffes that dominated the London musical stage at that time.

In early 1875 Carte was managing London's Royalty Theatre. Needing a short piece to round out an evening's entertainment featuring the popular Offenbach operetta La Périchole he brought W. S. Gilbert and Arthur Sullivan together. (Note: Gilbert and Sullivan's only previous collaboration, Thespis (1871), was a Christmas entertainment for a different management and made only a modest impact.) On tour in 1871, Carte had conducted Sullivan's one-act comic opera Cox and Box, (Note: The composer's brother Fred Sullivan played Cox.) which received an 1874 London revival. In 1873 Gilbert had offered a libretto to Carte about an English courtroom, but at the time Carte knew of no composer available to set it to music. Carte remembered Gilbert's libretto and suggested to Gilbert that Sullivan write the music for a one-act comic opera, Trial by Jury, which was quickly composed and added to the Royalty's bill in March 1875. The witty and "very English" little piece proved even more popular than La Périchole and became the first great success of Carte's scheme to found his school of English comic opera, playing for 300 performances from 1875 to 1877, as well as touring and enjoying many revivals.

At the Theatre Royal, in Dublin, Ireland in September 1875, while managing the first tour of Trial by Jury, Carte met an owner of the theatre, Michael Gunn, who was fascinated by Carte's vision for establishing a company to promote English comic opera. Gunn later joined Carte's management team. Still, Carte continued to produce continental operetta, touring in the summer of 1876 with a repertoire consisting of three English adaptations of French opera bouffe and two one-act English curtain raisers (Happy Hampstead and Trial by Jury). Carte himself was the musical director of this travelling company, which disbanded after the tour.

Helen Lenoir, later Helen Carte

Carte found four financial backers and formed the Comedy Opera Company in 1876 to produce more works by Gilbert and Sullivan, along with the works of other British lyricist/composer teams. With this theatre company, Carte finally had the financial resources, after many failed attempts, to produce a new full-length Gilbert and Sullivan opera. Carte leased the Opera Comique, a small theatre off The Strand. In February 1877 Carte engaged a novice Scottish actress, Helen Lenoir, for a small role in a touring production. She soon left the tour and obtained a position in Carte's entertainment agency. Lenoir was well-educated, and her grasp of detail and diplomacy, as well as her organisational ability and business acumen, surpassed even Carte's. Frank Desprez, the editor of The Era, wrote: "Her character exactly compensated for the deficiencies in his." She became intensely involved in all of his business affairs and soon managed many of the company's responsibilities, especially concerning touring. She travelled to America numerous times over the years to arrange the details of the company's New York engagements and American tours.

The first comic opera produced by the Comedy Opera Company was Gilbert and Sullivan's The Sorcerer, about a tradesmanlike London sorcerer. It opened in November 1877 together with Dora's Dream, a curtain-raiser with music by Sullivan's assistant Alfred Cellier and words by Arthur Cecil, a friend of both Gilbert and Sullivan. Instead of writing a piece for production by a theatre proprietor, as was usual in Victorian theatres, Gilbert, Sullivan and Carte produced the show with their own financial support. They were therefore able to select their own cast of performers, rather than being obliged to use the actors already engaged at the theatre. They chose talented actors, most of whom were not well-known stars and did not command high fees, and to whom they could teach a more naturalistic style of performance than was commonly used at the time. Carte's talent agency provided many of the artists to perform in the new work. They then tailored their work to the particular abilities of these performers. Some of the cast members, including principal comedian George Grossmith, Richard Temple and Rutland Barrington, stayed with the company for almost 15 years. Two other longstanding members of the company were Rosina Brandram, who started in D'Oyly Carte touring companies with The Sorcerer, and Jessie Bond who joined the group for Pinafore at the Opera Comique in 1878. As Grossmith wrote in 1888, "We are all a very happy family."

Knowing that Gilbert and Sullivan shared his vision of broadening the audience for British light opera by increasing its quality and respectability, Carte gave Gilbert wider authority as a director than was customary among Victorian producers, and Gilbert tightly controlled all aspects of production, including staging, design and movement. Gilbert hired the Gaiety Theatre's ballet-master John D'Auban to choreograph most of the Savoy operas. The skill with which Gilbert and Sullivan used their performers had an effect on the audience; as the critic Herman Klein wrote: "we secretly marvelled at the naturalness and ease with which [the Gilbertian quips and absurdities] were said and done. For until then no living soul had seen upon the stage such weird, eccentric, yet intensely human beings .... [They] conjured into existence a hitherto unknown comic world of sheer delight." The Sorcerer ran for 178 performances, a healthy run at the time, making a profit, and Carte sent out a touring company in March 1878. Sheet music from the show sold well, and street musicians played the melodies. The success of The Sorcerer showed Carte, Gilbert and Sullivan that there was a future in family-friendly English comic opera.

=== Pinafore to Patience ===
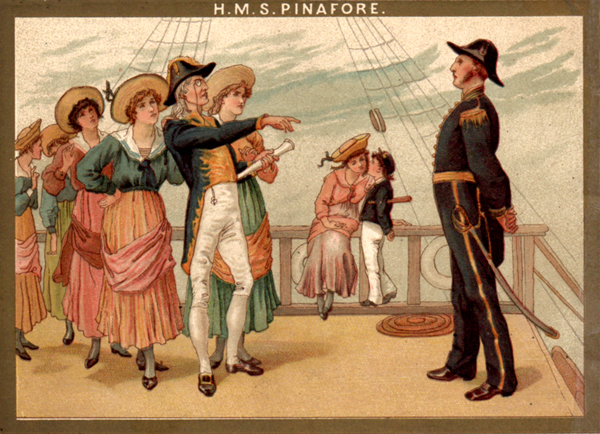
Scene from 1886 Savoy Theatre souvenir programme

The next Gilbert and Sullivan collaboration, H.M.S. Pinafore, opened in May 1878. The opera's initial slow business was generally ascribed to a heat wave that made the stuffy Opera Comique particularly uncomfortable. Carte's partners in the Comedy Opera Company lost confidence in the show and posted closing notices. After Carte made promotional efforts and Sullivan included some of the Pinafore music in several promenade concerts that he conducted at Covent Garden, Pinafore became a hit. The Opera Comique was required to close at Christmas 1878 for repairs to drainage and sewage under the Public Health Act 1875. Carte used the enforced closure of the theatre to invoke a contract clause reverting the rights of Pinafore and Sorcerer to Gilbert and Sullivan after the initial run of H.M.S. Pinafore. Carte then took a six-month personal lease on the theatre beginning on 1 February 1879. Carte persuaded Gilbert and Sullivan that when their original agreement with the Comedy Opera Company expired in July 1879, a business partnership among the three of them would be to their advantage. The three each put up £1,000 and formed a new partnership under the name "Mr Richard D'Oyly Carte's Opera Company". Under the partnership agreement, once the expenses of mounting the productions had been deducted, each of the three men was entitled to one third of the profits.

On 31 July 1879, the last day of their agreement with Gilbert and Sullivan, the directors of the Comedy Opera Company attempted to repossess the set by force during a performance, causing a celebrated fracas. Carte's stagehands managed to ward off their backstage attackers and protect the scenery. The Comedy Opera Company opened a rival production of H.M.S. Pinafore in London, but it was not as popular as the D'Oyly Carte production, and soon closed. Legal action over the ownership of the rights ended in victory for Carte, Gilbert and Sullivan. (Note: The question turned on whether the Company's agreement with the authors had expired along with the Company's lease of the Opera Comique on 31 July 1879. The courts decided that it did.) From 1 August 1879, the company, later called the D'Oyly Carte Opera Company, became the sole authorised producer of the works of Gilbert and Sullivan.

Pinafore became so successful that the piano score sold 10,000 copies, and Carte soon sent two additional companies out to tour in the provinces. The opera ran for 571 performances in London, the second longest run in musical theatre history up to that time. More than 150 unauthorised productions sprang up in America alone, but because American law then offered no copyright protection to foreigners, Gilbert, Sullivan and Carte had no way to prevent them. To try to make some money from the popularity of their opera in America, Carte travelled to New York with Gilbert, Sullivan and the company to present an "authentic" production of Pinafore on Broadway, beginning in December 1879, also mounting American tours. Beginning with Pinafore, Carte licensed the J. C. Williamson company to produce the works in Australia and New Zealand.

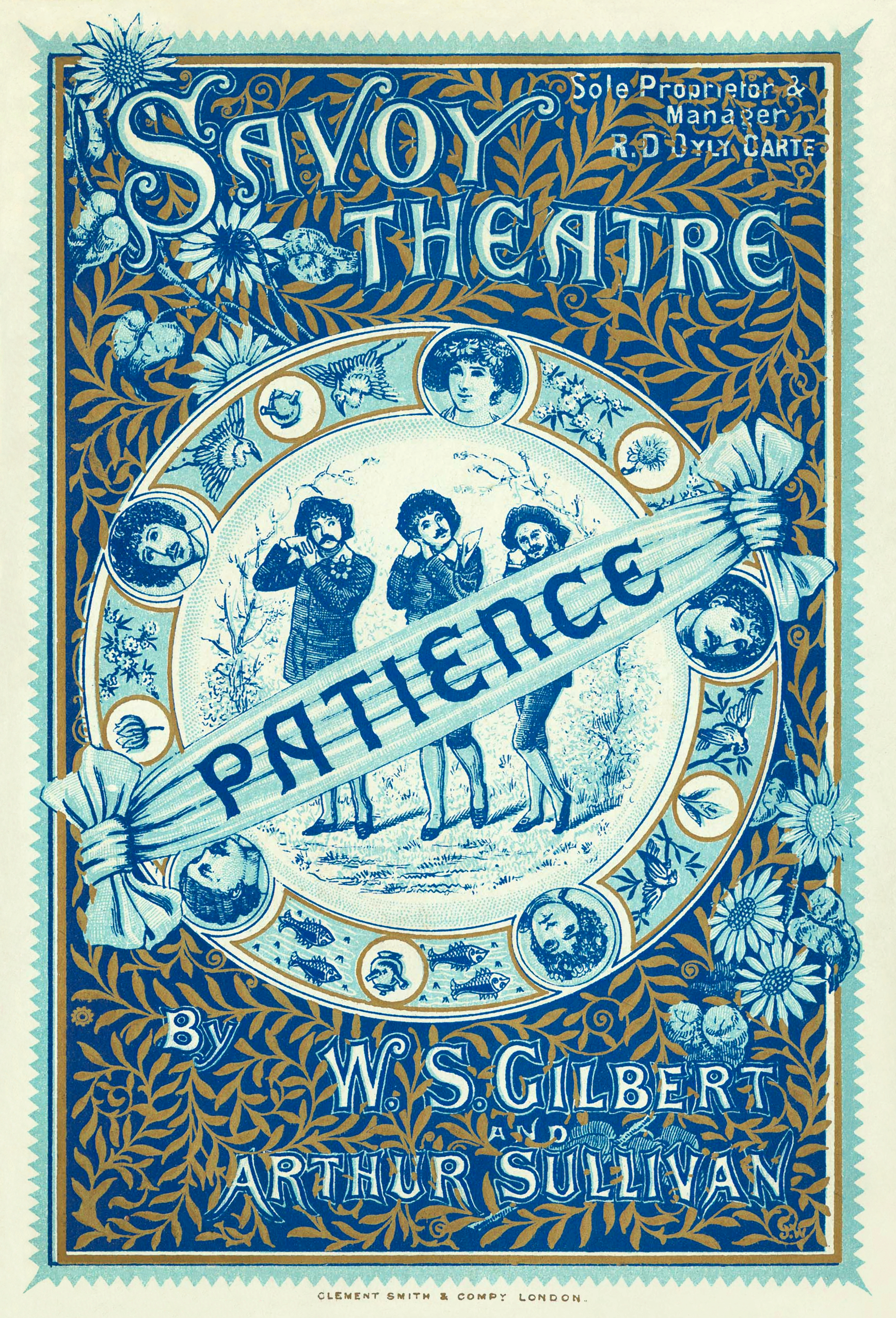
1881 theatre programme for Patience

In an effort to head off unauthorised American productions of their next opera, The Pirates of Penzance, Carte and his partners opened it in New York on 31 December 1879, prior to its 1880 London premiere. Pirates was the only Gilbert and Sullivan opera to have its official premiere in America. Carte and his partners hoped to forestall further "piracy" by establishing the authorised production and tours in America before others could copy it and by delaying publication of the score and libretto. They did succeed in keeping for themselves the direct profits of the venture, but they tried without success for many years to control the American performance copyrights over their operas. Pirates was an immediate hit in New York, and later London, becoming one of the most popular Gilbert and Sullivan operas. To secure the British copyright, there was a perfunctory performance the afternoon before the New York premiere, at the Royal Bijou Theatre, Paignton, Devon, organised by Helen Lenoir.

The next Gilbert and Sullivan opera, Patience, opened at the Opera Comique in April 1881 and was another big success, becoming the second longest-running piece in the series and enjoying numerous foreign productions. Patience satirised the self-indulgent Aesthetic movement of the 1870s and '80s in England, part of the 19th-century European movement that emphasised aesthetic values over moral or social themes in literature, fine art, the decorative arts, and interior design. From the beginning, the D'Oyly Carte Opera Company established strict rules for its actors and actresses, to avoid any hint of scandal such as performers were accused of in other companies. As Jessie Bond described in her autobiography:

No lingering about was allowed, no gossiping with the other actors; the women’s dressing-rooms were on one side of the stage, the men's on the other, and when we were not actually playing we had to mount at once our respective narrow staircases – sheep rigorously separated from the goats! Once, when my mother came to see me in London, expecting to find me dwelling in haunts of gilded luxury, and far down the road to perdition, I took her behind the scenes and showed her the arrangements for the actors and actresses, conventual in their austerity. ... I think there never was a theatre run on lines of such strict propriety; no breath of scandal ever touched it in all the twenty years of my experience. Gilbert would suffer no loose word or gesture either behind the stage or on it, and watched over us young women like a dragon.

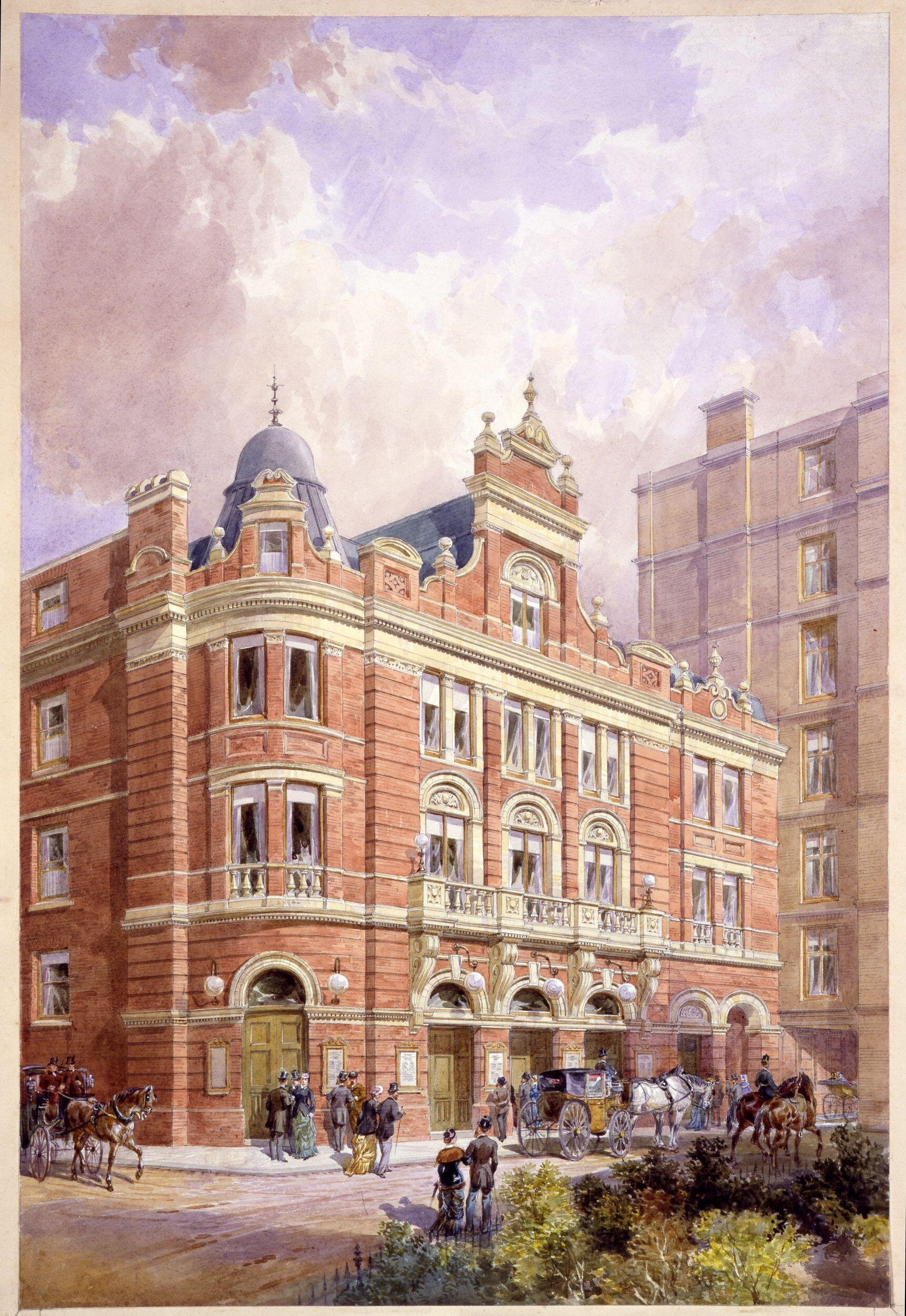
Original facade of the Savoy Theatre, c. 1881

With profits from the success of the Gilbert and Sullivan operas and his concert and lecture agency (his talent roster included Adelina Patti, Clara Schumann, Offenbach, Oscar Wilde and Charles Gounod), Carte bought property along the Strand with frontage onto the Thames Embankment, where he built the Savoy Theatre in 1881. He chose the name in honour of the Savoy Palace. The Savoy Theatre was a state-of-the-art facility, setting a new standard for technology, comfort and decor. It was the first public building in the world to be lit entirely by electric lights and seated nearly 1,300 people (compared to the Opera Comique's 862).

Patience was the first production at the new theatre, transferring there on 10 October 1881. The first generator proved too small to power the whole building, and though the entire front-of-house was electrically lit, the stage was lit by gas until 28 December 1881. At that performance, Carte stepped on stage and broke a glowing lightbulb before the audience to demonstrate the safety of the new technology. The Times concluded that the theatre "is admirably adapted for its purpose, its acoustic qualities are excellent, and all reasonable demands of comfort and taste are complied with." Carte and his manager, George Edwardes (later famous as manager of the Gaiety Theatre), introduced several innovations at the theatre, including numbered seating, free programme booklets, the "queue" system for the pit and gallery (an American idea) and a policy of no tipping for cloakroom or other services. Daily expenses at the theatre were about half the possible takings from ticket sales. The last eight of Gilbert and Sullivan's comic operas were premièred at the Savoy.

During the years when the Gilbert and Sullivan operas were being written, the company also produced operas by other composer–librettist teams, either as curtain-raisers to the Gilbert and Sullivan pieces, or as touring productions, as well as other works to fill the Savoy Theatre in between Savoy operas, and Carte also toured the Gilbert and Sullivan operas extensively. For example, a souvenir programme commemorating the 250th performance of Patience in London and its 100th performance in New York shows that, aside from these two productions of Patience, Carte was simultaneously producing two companies touring with Patience, two companies touring with other Gilbert and Sullivan operas, a company touring with Olivette (co-produced with Charles Wyndham) a company touring Claude Duval in America, a production of Youth running at a New York theatre, a lecture tour by Archibald Forbes (a war correspondent) and productions of Patience, Pirates, Claude Duval and Billee Taylor in association with J. C. Williamson in Australia, among other things.

In the 1880s Carte also introduced the practice of licensing amateur theatrical societies to present works for which he held the rights, increasing their popularity and the sales of scores and libretti, as well as the rental of band parts. (Note: Bradley notes that royalties from British amateur companies were 10 per cent of the box office take plus hire costs for the band parts and prompt books) This had an important influence on amateur theatre in general. Cellier and Bridgeman wrote in 1914 that, prior to the creation of the Savoy operas, amateur actors were treated with contempt by professionals. After the formation of amateur Gilbert and Sullivan companies licensed to perform the operas, professionals recognised that the amateur societies "support the culture of music and the drama. They are now accepted as useful training schools for the legitimate stage, and from the volunteer ranks have sprung many present-day favourites." Cellier and Bridgeman attributed the rise in quality and reputation of the amateur groups largely to "the popularity of, and infectious craze for performing, the Gilbert and Sullivan operas". The National Operatic and Dramatic Association was founded in 1899. It reported, in 1914, that nearly 200 British societies were producing Gilbert and Sullivan operas that year. Carte insisted that amateur companies follow the D'Oyly Carte Opera Company staging, using its prompt books. Even after the copyrights expired at the end of 1961, the D'Oyly Carte Opera Trust continued to, and still does, rent out band parts to companies around the world.

=== Iolanthe to The Gondoliers ===
Poster for Iolanthe

After Patience, the company produced Iolanthe, which opened in 1882. During its run, in February 1883, Carte signed a five-year partnership agreement with Gilbert and Sullivan, obligating them to create new operas for the company upon six months' notice. Sullivan had not intended immediately to write a new work with Gilbert, but he suffered a serious financial loss when his broker went bankrupt in November 1882 and must have felt the long-term contract necessary for his security. But he soon felt trapped. The Gilbert scholar Andrew Crowther comments, regarding the agreement: "Effectively, it made [Gilbert and Sullivan] Carte's employees – a situation which created its own resentments." The partnership's next opera, Princess Ida, opened in January 1884. Carte soon saw that Ida was running weakly at the box office and invoked the agreement to call upon his partners for a new opera to be written. Almost from the beginning of the partnership, the musical establishment put pressure on Sullivan to abandon comic opera, (Note: For example, The Times, favourably reviewing H.M.S. Pinafore, nevertheless added, "we cannot suppress a word of regret that the composer on whom before all others the chances of a national school of music depend should confine himself ... to a class of production which, however attractive, is hardly worthy of the efforts of an accomplished and serious artist".) and he soon regretted having signed the five-year contract. In March 1884 Sullivan told Carte that "it is impossible for me to do another piece of the character of those already written by Gilbert and myself."

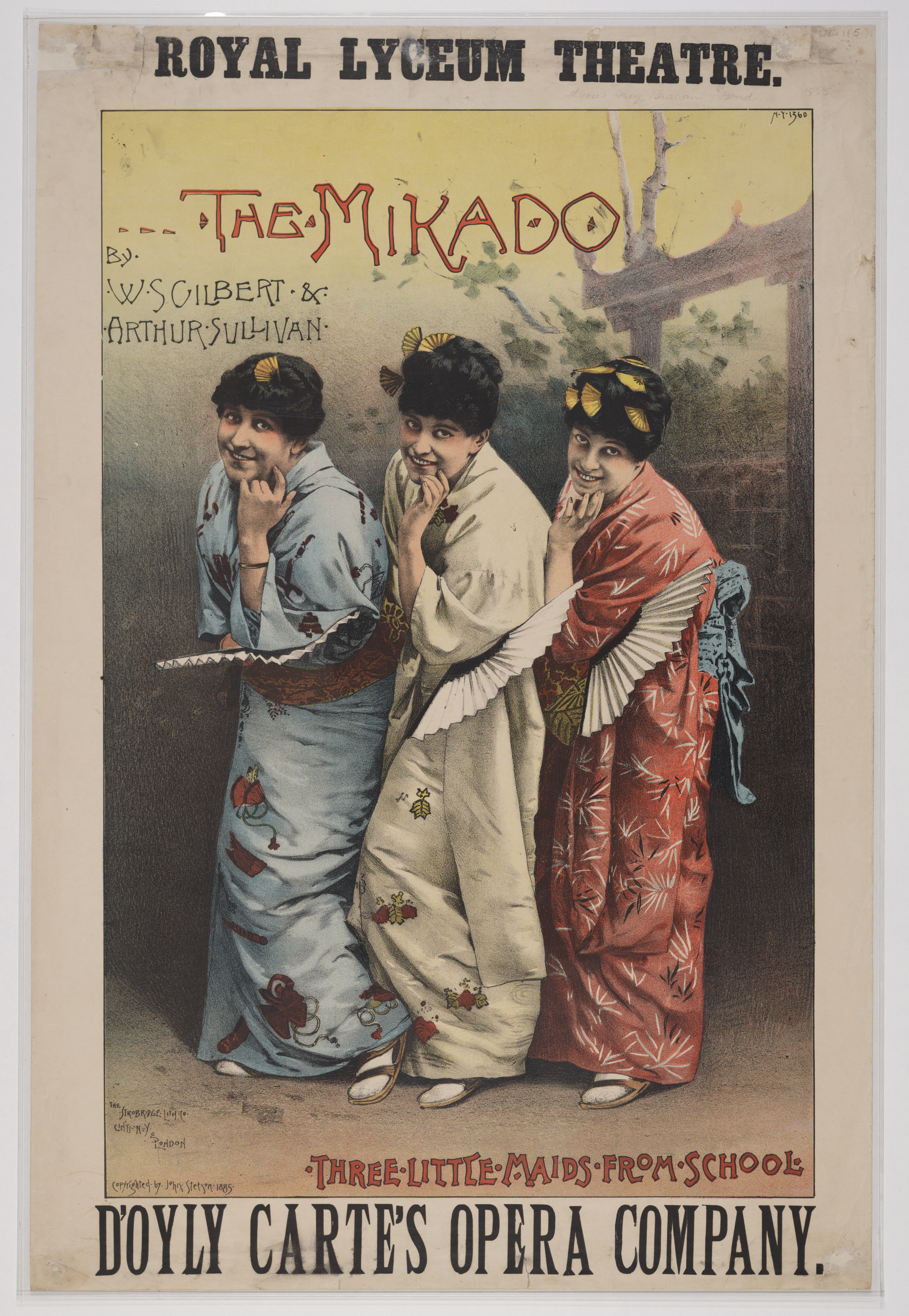
Lithograph from The Mikado

During this conflict and others during the 1880s, Carte and Helen Lenoir frequently had to smooth over the partners' differences with a mixture of friendship and business acumen. Sullivan asked to be released from the partnership on several occasions. Nevertheless, they coaxed eight comic operas out of Gilbert and Sullivan in the 1880s. When Princess Ida closed after a comparatively short run of nine months, for the first time in the partnership's history, the next opera was not ready. To make matters worse, Gilbert suggested a plot in which people fell in love against their wills after taking a magic lozenge – a scenario that Sullivan had previously rejected, and he now rejected the "lozenge plot" again. Gilbert eventually came up with a new idea and began work in May 1884.

The company produced the first revival of The Sorcerer, together with Trial by Jury, and matinees of The Pirates of Penzance played by a cast of children, while waiting for the new work to be completed. This became the partnership's most successful opera, The Mikado, which opened in March 1885. The piece satirised British institutions by setting them in a fictional Japan. At the same time, it took advantage of the Victorian craze for the exotic Far East using the "picturesque" scenery and costumes of Japan. The Mikado became the partnership's longest-running hit, enjoying 672 performances at the Savoy Theatre, the second longest run for any work of musical theatre up to that time, (Note: The longest-running piece of musical theatre was the operetta Les Cloches de Corneville, which held that position until the record-breaking run of Dorothy in 1886.) and it was extraordinarily popular in the U.S. and worldwide. It remains the most frequently performed Savoy opera. Beginning with The Mikado, Hawes Craven, the designer of the sets for Henry Irving's spectacular Shakespeare productions at the Lyceum Theatre, designed all the D'Oyly Carte sets until 1893. (Note: Craven had earlier designed the sets for Act II of Princess Ida.)

The partnership's next opera was Ruddigore, which opened in January 1887. It satirised and used elements of Victorian stock melodrama. The piece, though profitable, was a relative disappointment after the extraordinary success of The Mikado. When Ruddigore closed after a run of only nine months, the company mounted revivals of earlier Gilbert and Sullivan operas for almost a year. After another attempt by Gilbert to persuade Sullivan to set a "lozenge plot", Gilbert met his collaborator half way by writing a serio-comic plot for The Yeomen of the Guard, which premiered in October 1888. The opera was a success, running for over a year, with strong New York and touring productions. During the run, in March 1889, Sullivan again expressed reluctance to write another comic opera, asking if Gilbert would write a "dramatic work on a larger musical scale". Gilbert declined, but offered a compromise that Sullivan ultimately accepted: The two would write a light opera for the Savoy, and at the same time, Sullivan could work on a grand opera (Ivanhoe) for a new theatre that Carte was constructing to present British grand opera. The new comic opera was The Gondoliers, which opened in December 1889 and became one of the partnership's greatest successes. After Carte's first wife died in 1885, Carte married Helen Lenoir in 1888, who was, by this time, nearly as important in managing the company as Carte himself.

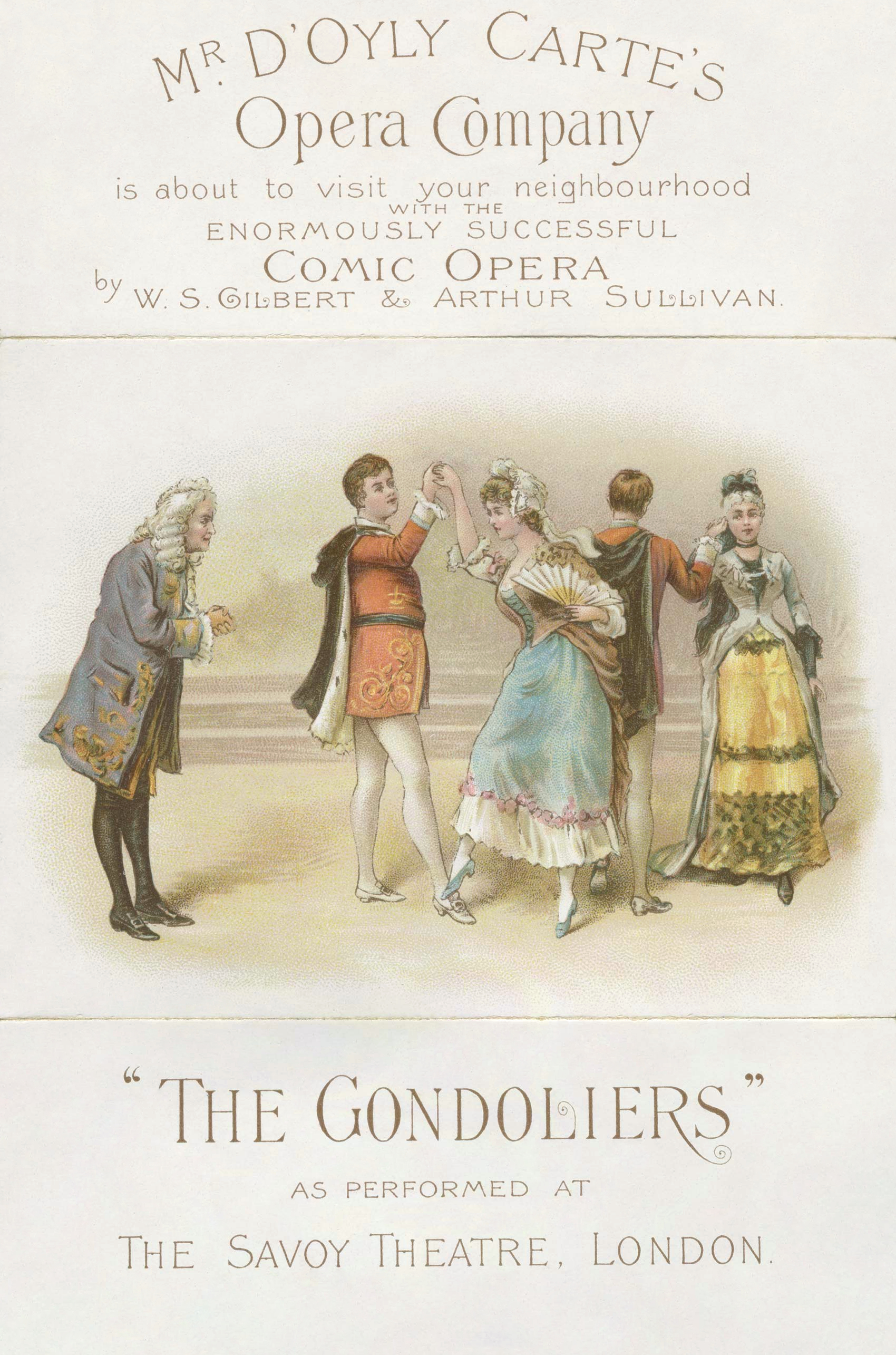
Touring advertisement, c. 1890

During these years, the company's high production values, and the quality of the operas, created a national and international taste for them, and the company mounted touring productions throughout the provinces, in America (generally managed by Helen), Europe and elsewhere. Queen Victoria honoured the company by calling for a Royal Command Performance of The Gondoliers at Windsor Castle in 1891. Bernard Shaw, writing in The World in October 1893, commented, "Those who are old enough to compare the Savoy performances with those of the dark ages, taking into account the pictorial treatment of the fabrics and colours on the stage, the cultivation and intelligence of the choristers, the quality of the orchestra, and the degree of artistic good breeding, so to speak, expected from the principals, best know how great an advance has been made by Mr. D'Oyly Carte."

=== The Carpet Quarrel and the end of the partnership ===
On 22 April 1890, during the run of The Gondoliers, Gilbert discovered that maintenance expenses for the theatre, including a new £500 carpet for the front lobby of the theatre, were being charged to the partnership instead of borne by Carte. Gilbert confronted Carte, and Carte refused to reconsider the accounts: Even though the amount of the charge was not great, Gilbert felt it was a moral issue involving Carte's integrity, and he could not look past it. Gilbert wrote in a letter to Sullivan that "I left him with the remark that it was a mistake to kick down the ladder by which he had risen". Helen Carte wrote that Gilbert had addressed Carte "in a way that I should not have thought you would have used to an offending menial." Gilbert brought a lawsuit, but Sullivan sided with Carte, who was building the Royal English Opera House, the inaugural production of which was to be Sullivan's forthcoming grand opera. Gilbert won the suit, but the partnership disbanded.

Sullivan's opera, Ivanhoe, had a successful run, but Carte did not find suitable successors for the theatre, and it soon failed. He sold it, and it later became the Palace Theatre.

After The Gondoliers closed in 1891, Gilbert withdrew the performance rights to his libretti and vowed to write no more operas for the Savoy. The D'Oyly Carte company turned to new writing teams for the Savoy, first producing The Nautch Girl, by George Dance, Desprez and Edward Solomon, which ran for a satisfying 200 performances in 1891–92. Next was a revival of Solomon and Sydney Grundy's The Vicar of Bray, which played through the summer of 1892. Grundy and Sullivan's Haddon Hall then held the stage until April 1893. While the company presented new pieces and revivals at the Savoy, Carte's touring companies continued to play throughout Britain and in America. In 1894, for example, Carte had four companies touring Britain and one playing in America.

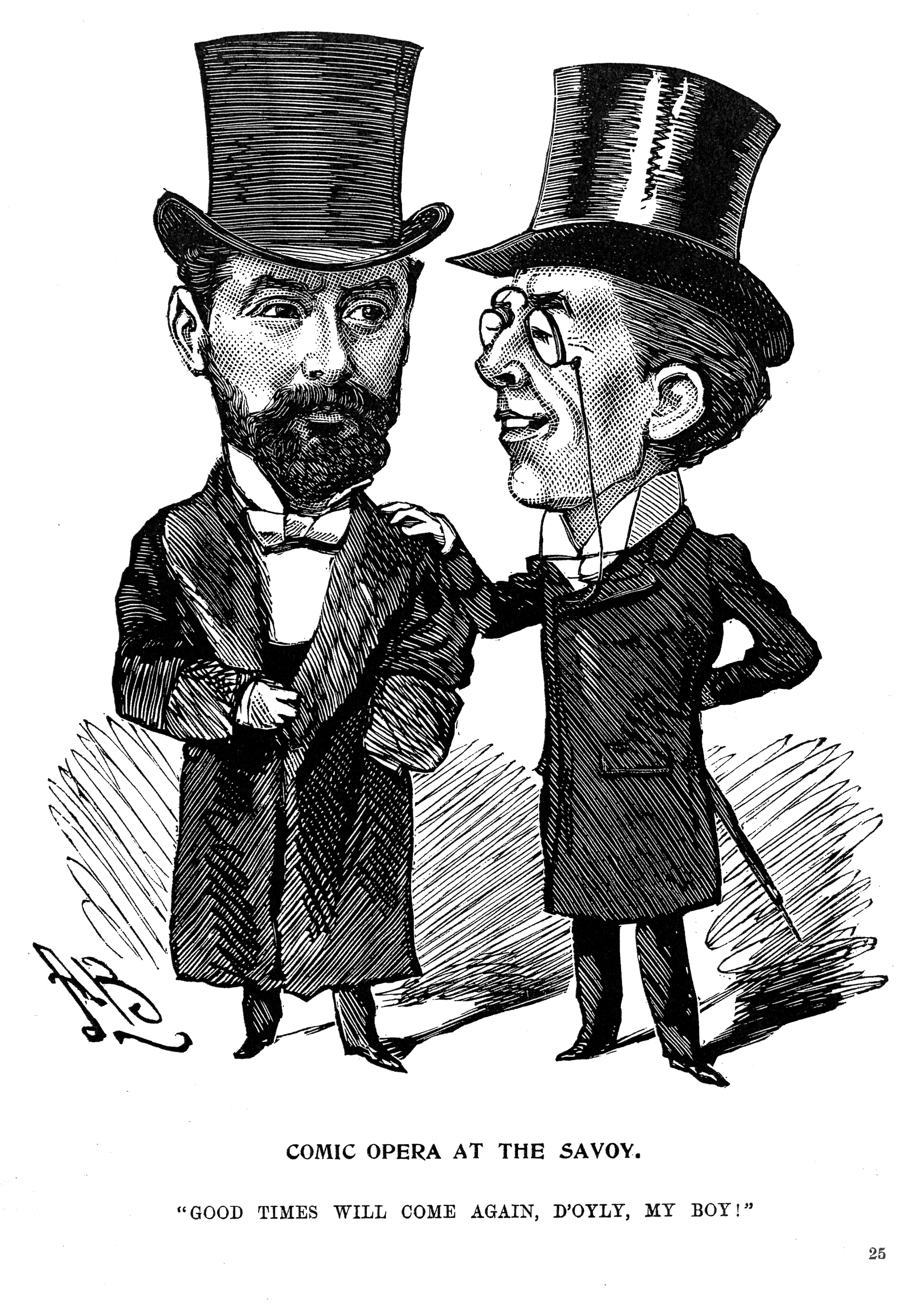
Grossmith comforts Carte after failure of The Grand Duke.

Gilbert's aggressive, though successful, legal action had embittered Sullivan and Carte, but the partnership had been so profitable that the Cartes eventually sought to reunite Gilbert and Sullivan. The reconciliation finally came through the efforts of Tom Chappell, who published the sheet music to the Savoy operas. In 1893 the company produced the penultimate Gilbert and Sullivan collaboration, Utopia, Limited. While Utopia was being prepared, the company produced Jane Annie, by J. M. Barrie and Arthur Conan Doyle, with music by Ernest Ford. Despite the popularity of Barrie and Conan Doyle, the show was a flop, closing in July 1893 after only 51 performances. Utopia was the Savoy's most expensive production to date, but it ran for a comparatively disappointing 245 performances, until June 1894, turning a very modest profit. The company then played first Mirette, composed by André Messager, then The Chieftain, by F. C. Burnand and Sullivan. These ran for 102 and 97 performances, respectively. After The Chieftain closed, the company toured the London suburbs, while Carte leased the Savoy Theatre to the Carl Rosa Opera Company. The theatre was dark during the summer of 1895, reopening in November for a revival of The Mikado. This was followed by The Grand Duke, in 1896, which ran for 123 performances and was Gilbert and Sullivan's only financial failure. The Gondoliers turned out to be Gilbert and Sullivan's last big hit, and after The Grand Duke, the two men never collaborated again.

In 1894 Carte had hired his son Rupert as an assistant. Rupert assisted Mrs. Carte and Gilbert with the first revival of The Yeomen of the Guard at the Savoy in May 1897. Throughout the later 1890s, Carte's health was declining, and Mrs. Carte assumed more and more of the responsibilities of running the opera company. She profitably managed the theatre and the provincial touring companies. The Savoy's shows during this period received comparatively short runs, including His Majesty (1897), The Grand Duchess of Gerolstein (1897), The Beauty Stone (1898) and The Lucky Star (1899), as well as revivals of the Gilbert and Sullivan operas. Sullivan's The Beauty Stone ran for only 50 performances. In 1899 the Savoy finally had a new success, with Sullivan and Basil Hood's The Rose of Persia, which ran for 213 performances. Neither Carte nor Sullivan lived to see the production of Sullivan and Hood's The Emerald Isle (1901), for which Edward German completed the score.

=== Early 20th century ===
Carte left his theatre, opera company and hotels to his wife, who assumed full control of the family businesses. Her London and touring companies continued to present the Savoy operas in Britain and overseas. She leased the Savoy Theatre to William Greet in 1901 and oversaw his management of the company's revival of Iolanthe and the production of several new comic operas, including The Emerald Isle (1901), Merrie England (1902) and A Princess of Kensington (with music by German, libretto by Hood), which ran for four months in early 1903 and then toured. When A Princess of Kensington closed at the Savoy, Mrs. Carte leased the theatre to other managements until 8 December 1906. The company's fortunes declined for a time, and by 1904 there was only a single touring company wending its way through the British provinces, when it took a seven-month South African tour.

In 1906–07 Mrs. Carte staged a repertory season at the Savoy Theatre, with Gilbert returning to direct. The season, which included Yeomen, The Gondoliers, Patience and Iolanthe, was a sensation and led to another in 1908–09 including The Mikado, Pinafore, Iolanthe, Pirates, The Gondoliers and Yeomen. Afterwards, however, Mrs. Carte's health prevented her from staging more London seasons. She retired and leased the theatre to C. H. Workman, and the company did not perform in London again until 1919, although it continued to tour throughout Britain.

Rupert D'Oyly Carte

After Gilbert's death in 1911, the company continued to produce productions of the operas in repertory until 1982. In 1911, Helen Carte hired J. M. Gordon as stage manager. Gordon, who was promoted to stage director in 1922, had been a member of the company and a stage manager under Gilbert's direction, and he fiercely preserved the company's performing traditions in exacting detail for 28 years. Except for Ruddigore, which underwent some cuts and received a new overture, very few changes were made to the text and music of the operas as Gilbert and Sullivan had produced them, and the company stayed true to Gilbert's period settings. Even after Gordon's death, many of Gilbert's directorial concepts survived, both in the stage directions printed in the libretti and as preserved in company prompt books. Original choreography was also maintained. Some of the company's staging became accepted as traditional by Gilbert and Sullivan fans, and many of these traditional stagings are still imitated today in productions by both amateur and professional companies.

Helen Carte died in 1913, and Carte's son Rupert inherited the company. (Note: Carte's older son, Lucas, was a barrister and took no part in the family businesses. He died of tuberculosis in 1907, aged 34.) During World War I, he was away serving in the Royal Navy. According to H. M. Walbrook, "Through the years of the Great War [the company] continued to be on tour through the country, drawing large and grateful audiences everywhere. They helped to sustain the spirits of the people during that stern period, and by so doing they helped to win the victory." The company also toured in North America several times, beginning with a Canadian tour in 1927.

Rupert D'Oyly Carte found the company's productions increasingly "dowdy", however, and on his return from the war, he determined to refresh them, bringing in new designers including W. Bridges-Adams for the sets, and, for the costumes, George Sheringham and Hugo Rumbold. He also commissioned new costumes from Percy Anderson who had worked with Gilbert and Richard D'Oyly Carte on the original productions of the later Savoy operas. Charles Ricketts redesigned sets and costumes for The Mikado (1926) and The Gondoliers (1929). His costumes for The Mikado were retained by all subsequent designers until 1982. In an interview in The Observer in August 1919, Carte set out his policy for staging the operas: "They will be played precisely in their original form, without any alteration to the words, or any attempt to bring them up to date." This uncompromising declaration was modified in a later interview in which he said, "the plays are all being restaged. ... Gilbert's words will be unaltered, though there will be some freshness in the method of rendering them. Artists must have scope for their individuality, and new singers cannot be tied down to imitate slavishly those who made successes in the old days."

Souvenir programme cover, 1919–20 season

The main company made a triumphant return to London for the 1919–20 season at the Prince's Theatre, playing most of the Gilbert and Sullivan operas in repertory and showing off the new sets and costumes. The success of this season led to additional London seasons in 1921–22, 1924, and 1926; the company toured the rest of the year. Carte's first London season stimulated renewed interest in the operas, and by 1920 he had established a second, smaller company to tour smaller towns. It was disbanded in 1927, although the company often ran multiple tours simultaneously. For London seasons, Carte engaged guest conductors, first Geoffrey Toye, then Malcolm Sargent, who examined Sullivan's manuscript scores and purged the orchestral parts of accretions. So striking was the orchestral sound produced by Sargent that the press thought he had retouched the scores, and Carte had the pleasant duty of correcting their error. In a letter to The Times, he noted that "the details of the orchestration sounded so fresh that some of the critics thought them actually new... the opera was played last night exactly as written by Sullivan." Carte also hired Harry Norris, who started with the touring company, then was Toye's assistant before becoming musical director.

In 1917 the company made the first complete recording of a Gilbert and Sullivan opera, The Mikado, for the Gramophone Company. (Note: The recording was issued under the "D'Oyly Carte" name, but in fact none of the singers on it were members of the company.) Rupert D'Oyly Carte supervised the company's recordings, including eight more acoustic recordings by 1924, and a series of electrical recordings (without dialogue) in the late 1920s and early 1930s. There were additional recordings, in high fidelity, for Decca Records, in the late 1940s and early 1950s and stereo recordings in the late 1950s and early 1960s, all supervised after Rupert's death by his daughter, Bridget D'Oyly Carte.

=== The new Savoy Theatre ===
1921 cartoon: D'Oyly Carte audiences

Rupert D'Oyly Carte also redesigned the Savoy Theatre. On 3 June 1929 the Savoy closed, and it was completely rebuilt to designs by Frank A. Tugwell with décor by Basil Ionides. The old house had three tiers; the new one had two. The seating capacity was increased from 986 to 1,158. The theatre reopened 135 days later on 21 October 1929, with The Gondoliers, designed by Ricketts and conducted by Sargent. Sheringham designed new productions that season for H.M.S. Pinafore, The Pirates of Penzance and Patience (1929, with other designs contributed by Rumbold), and he later designed costumes for Trial by Jury and Iolanthe.

The Savoy also hosted London seasons for the company in 1930–31, 1933, 1941, 1951, 1954, 1961, 1963–64, and 1975. London seasons at other theatres, mostly Sadler's Wells, included summer seasons from 1935 to 1939, 1942, 1947 to 1950, 1953, 1971, 1975, 1977 and 1980; and winter seasons in 1956–57, 1958–59, 1960–61, 1963–64, 1965–66, 1967–68, and then every winter between 1969–70 and 1981–82. The company continued to tour the British provinces and abroad when it was not in London, and these tours also often included London suburbs. The company's musical director from 1929 (having been assistant musical director from 1925) was Isidore Godfrey, who retained the position until 1968 and guest conducted the company in 1975, as part of the centenary season at the Savoy Theatre. Guest conductors during Godfrey's tenure were Sargent and Boyd Neel. Henry Lytton retired in 1934 after a quarter century as the principal comedian, and the company made a highly successful eight-month North American tour with its new principal comedian, Martyn Green. In 1938 many company members participated in the Technicolor film of The Mikado produced and conducted by Geoffrey Toye.

On 3 September 1939, at the outbreak of World War II, the British government ordered the immediate and indefinite closure of all theatres. Carte cancelled the autumn tour and disbanded the company. Theatres were permitted to reopen from 9 September, but it took some weeks to reestablish the company. Some performers, including Martyn Green, were already committed elsewhere, and Grahame Clifford was engaged to play his roles. The company resumed touring, in Edinburgh, on Christmas Day 1939. The company continued to perform throughout the war, both on tour and in London, but in 1940 German bombing destroyed the sets and costumes for five of its shows: Cox and Box, The Sorcerer, H.M.S. Pinafore, Princess Ida and Ruddigore. The old productions of Pinafore and Cox and Box were recreated shortly after the war, and Ruddigore received a new production, planned by Carte but not seen until after his death. The other two operas took longer to rejoin the company's repertory. (Note: Pinafore re-entered the repertory in July 1947, Cox and Box in the 1947/48 season, Ruddigore in November 1948, and Princess Ida in September 1954. The Sorcerer was not revived until April 1971.) On the other hand, for the first wartime season, Peter Goffin, a protégé of Carte's daughter, Bridget, had designed a new production of The Yeomen of the Guard first seen in January 1940, and his new Ruddigore debuted in 1948. A return to the U.S. in 1947 was very successful, and the company resumed frequent visits to America.

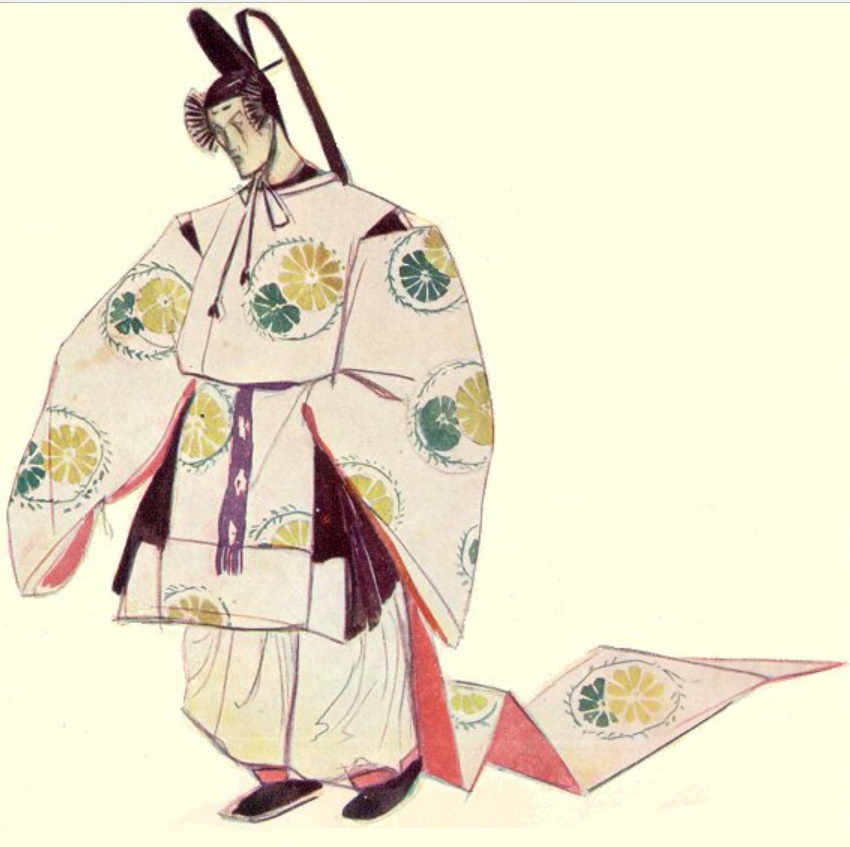
Ricketts's 1926 Mikado design

Rupert died in 1948, leaving a strong company to his daughter Bridget. She soon hired Frederic Lloyd as general manager. Bridget and Lloyd also took steps to keep the productions fresh, engaging designers to redesign the costumes and scenery. Peter Goffin, who had redesigned Yeomen (1939) and Ruddigore (1948) for the company, created new settings and costumes for Bridget for half a dozen more productions: The Mikado (1952; settings only, most of the celebrated Ricketts costumes being retained), Patience (1957), The Gondoliers (1958), Trial by Jury (1959), H.M.S. Pinafore (1961; ladies' costumes) and Iolanthe (1961). A new production of Princess Ida in 1954 was designed by James Wade. Eleanor Evans, however, was an example of the company's stage directors from 1949 to 1953 who were said to be reluctant to update and freshen stagings. In 1957 Goffin designed a unit set for the company to facilitate touring, reducing the number of vans required to carry the scenery from twenty to nine. A 1957 review of Yeomen in The Times praised the production and marvelled at "the continued vitality of the Savoy operas", noting: "The opera remains enchanting; the singing seems, on the whole, better and more musical than that which one used to hear, say, 30 years since; and though the acting lacks some of the richly crusted performances of those days, it is perhaps none the worse for that". In 1949 the company began a new series of recordings with Decca, featuring Green, who had returned to the company after the war, and continued the series with his successor, Peter Pratt. The company cooperated with the production of the 1953 film The Story of Gilbert and Sullivan, which used some former members of the company in the cast. In 1955 the company gave a seven-month tour to the U.S. to celebrate the 75th anniversary of its first American productions. In 1959 the company began the tradition of holding a zany "last night" on the last evening of each London season.

=== Later years and closing ===
With the approaching end of the D'Oyly Carte monopoly on Gilbert and Sullivan performances, when the copyright on Gilbert's words expired in 1961 (Sullivan's music had already come out of copyright at the end of 1950), Bridget D'Oyly Carte contributed the company and all its assets to an independent charitable trust, the D'Oyly Carte Opera Trust. She endowed the trust with the company's scenery, costumes, band parts and other assets, together with a cash endowment, and supervised the production of operas on behalf of the trust until economic necessity forced the closure of the company in 1982. As it turned out, competing professional productions of Gilbert and Sullivan did not harm the company. Beginning in 1959, the company re-recorded most of the operas with Pratt's successor, John Reed, (Note: Other singers in these recordings included Donald Adams, Jean Hindmarsh, Gillian Knight, Valerie Masterson, Thomas Round and Kenneth Sandford) and also recorded a number of other Sullivan pieces. It made a cinema film of The Mikado in 1966, and recorded for television broadcast its productions of Patience (1965) and H.M.S. Pinafore (1973). It also supplied the soundtrack for a cartoon film of Ruddigore (1967). During the 1960s, the company gave five North American tours. A new stage director, Michael Heyland, was hired in 1969, staying until 1978. Among his new productions were The Sorcerer in 1971, Utopia, Limited in 1975 and Iolanthe in 1977. (Note: The Sorcerer had costume and set designs by Osbert Lancaster.)

In March and April 1975, after the regular London season at Sadler's Wells, the company moved to the Savoy Theatre for a fortnight's centennial performances, beginning on 25 March, the 100th anniversary of the first performance of Trial by Jury. All thirteen surviving Gilbert and Sullivan operas were performed in chronological order. Trial by Jury was given four times, as a curtain raiser to The Sorcerer, Pinafore and Pirates and as an afterpiece following The Grand Duke. Before the first of the four performances of Trial, a specially written curtain raiser by William Douglas-Home, called Dramatic Licence, was played by Peter Pratt as Richard D'Oyly Carte, Sandford as Gilbert and John Ayldon as Sullivan, in which Gilbert, Sullivan and Carte plan the birth of Trial by Jury in 1875; afterwards, the prime minister, Harold Wilson, and Bridget D'Oyly Carte each gave a short speech. A highlight of the season was a new staging of Utopia Limited (later given again at the Royal Festival Hall), its first revival by the company. The Grand Duke was given as a concert performance, with narration by the BBC presenter Richard Baker. Royston Nash, who was at the company's musical helm from 1971 to 1979, conducted most of the performances, with Isidore Godfrey (Pinafore) and Sir Charles Mackerras (Pirates and Mikado) as guest conductors. Princes Philip and Andrew saw The Gondoliers. In the final performance of Trial by Jury, the regular D'Oyly Carte chorus was augmented by fourteen former stars of the company: Sylvia Cecil, Elsie Griffin, Ivan Menzies, John Dean, Radley Flynn, Elizabeth Nickell-Lean, Ella Halman, Leonard Osborn, Cynthia Morey, Jeffrey Skitch, Alan Barrett, Mary Sansom, Philip Potter and Gillian Humphreys. In 1977, during Queen Elizabeth II's Jubilee Year, the company gave a Royal Command Performance of Pinafore at Windsor Castle.

Throughout the 20th century, until 1982, the company toured, on average, for 35 weeks per year (in addition to its 13-week London seasons), fostering a "strong family atmosphere, reinforced by the number of marriages in the company and the fact that so many people stayed with it for so long." The principal soprano Valerie Masterson married the company's principal flautist, Andrew March. She explained, "people didn't have flats or houses ... touring was your life." Throughout its history, the company maintained strict moral standards, and it was sometimes referred to as the "Savoy boarding school", enforcing policies regarding behaviour on and off stage, and even a dress code. Soprano Cynthia Morey ascribed the strong affection that artists had for the company to "the unique family atmosphere engendered by the company's direct descent from its creators, Gilbert, Sullivan ... Richard D'Oyly Carte, followed by his widow, Helen, his son Rupert, and finally his granddaughter Bridget." The company also preserved, for over a century, what The Times called a "unique performance style, which may be summarised as a combination of good taste and good fun".

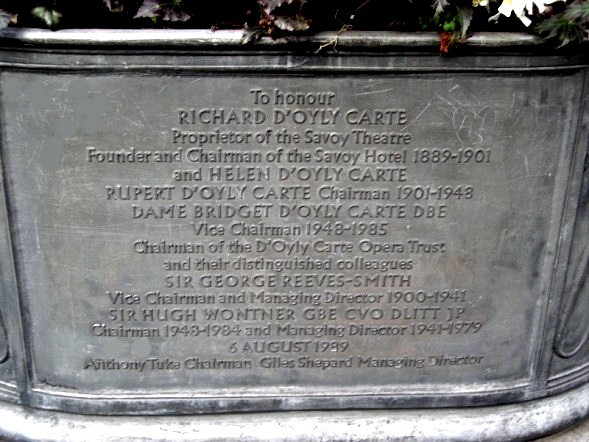
Planter in front of the Savoy Hotel honouring the Carte family and colleagues

The company visited Denmark in 1970, Rome in 1974, and gave its last American tours in 1976 and 1978. Its last tour, in Australasia, conducted by the company's new musical director, Fraser Goulding, was a success in 1979. After the 1979 tour, the rising costs of mounting year-round professional light opera without any government support, despite some generous private contributions, caused the company to accrue increasing losses. In 1980 the English Arts Council's Music Panel and Touring Committee recommended that the Arts Council make a grant to the company, but this idea was rejected. The company's fans made an effort to raise private funds, but these were insufficient to make up the accelerating losses. In 1981 the producer George Walker proposed to film the company performing all of the Gilbert and Sullivan operas but backed out. Bridget D'Oyly Carte was forced to close the company in 1982, after a final London season in which Reed and Masterson returned as guest artists. It gave its last performance on 27 February 1982, at the Adelphi Theatre. A three-LP recording of this performance was released, which included songs from all of the Gilbert and Sullivan operas. Richard D'Oyly Carte and his opera companies had presented Gilbert and Sullivan works nearly continuously for 107 years since the opening of Trial by Jury in 1875. Even after it closed, the company's productions continued to influence the productions of other Gilbert and Sullivan companies.

== Revival of the company ==
Dame Bridget D’Oyly Carte died in 1985, leaving in her will a £1 million legacy to enable the company to be revived. The company secured sponsorship from Sir Michael Bishop, who later became chairman of the board of trustees, the Birmingham City Council and BMI British Midland Airways (of which Bishop was chairman). Richard Condon was appointed the revived company's first general manager, and Bramwell Tovey was its first musical director. In succeeding seasons, the company's productions of The Mikado and H.M.S. Pinafore were nominated for Olivier Awards. From 1988 to 2003, the company mounted productions of the Gilbert and Sullivan operas on tour and in London, and it produced several operettas by Offenbach, Lehár and Strauss. Unlike the original company, which had regularly performed up to a dozen operas each year, 48 weeks a year, the new company generally presented only one or two operas in shorter seasons. In the first season, in 1988, the operas played were Iolanthe and The Yeomen of the Guard, both starring Gillian Knight. The company made its debut at the Sunderland Empire Theatre on 29 April 1988, and, after touring, opened in London at the Cambridge Theatre in July. The press notices were good, particularly about the musical aspects of the new company; opinion was divided about the staging. The Observer thought the productions "miles superior to the later work of the old D'Oyly Carte; better designed, better lit ... better played and better sung." A review in The Guardian praised the musical standards, but added, "Gilbert and Sullivan is as much theatrical as musical entertainment and there remains a lot to be done on the visual side."

The two operas presented in 1989 were The Mikado and The Pirates of Penzance. The new company's first three productions were broadly traditional in their staging. The Pirates, however, marked a break with traditional presentations, with the setting a giant toy-box and a collapsible toy boat. In 1990 the company presented campier versions of Pinafore and Trial (including a heavily pregnant Angelina) that were much criticised by the old company's fans, who complained that it was a betrayal of the legacy left by Bridget D'Oyly Carte. The next season departed further from earnest presentations in its production of The Gondoliers, which included a deeply corrugated stage floor, "startling", "surreal, primary coloured, starkly angled sets", gimmicky distracting business and generally staging that was considered "way over the top". It "was unveiled to storms of outraged booing". Most of the critics shared the public's disapproval of the production. The Times wrote, "The satiric point disappears in meretricious ado and humourless humour". Some critics, however, thought that it was time to sweep away "bad and lazy" traditions of the old company, calling the production "riotous, zany and subversive ... with a Goonish or Pythonesque sense of slapstick comedy", noting that "The girls are pretty and the boys are handsome, and they sing and dance with a youthful freshness". Also in 1991, the company accepted an offer from the Alexandra Theatre, Birmingham, to make its base there, although its pattern of spring national tours and summer London seasons was not affected. In 1997, following cuts in the funding of the theatre at Birmingham, the company moved its base to the Grand Theatre, Wolverhampton.

Another initiative was to stage a foreign operetta for the first time since Richard D'Oyly Carte's day, in what would be D'Oyly Carte's first co-production. The work chosen was Orpheus in the Underworld, which Opera North presented in 1992 and D'Oyly Carte toured in 1993 as part of its 35-week tour celebrating the 150th anniversary of Sullivan's birth. The innovation was welcomed, receiving an Arts Council Grant, and the company later presented Die Fledermaus (1994), La Vie parisienne (1995) and The Count of Luxembourg (1997). Of the Savoy operas, the new company never staged The Sorcerer, Patience, Princess Ida, Ruddigore, Utopia and The Grand Duke, stating that they lacked box-office potential.

Unlike its predecessor, the new company was not a permanent ensemble with a recognisable style. Some performers appeared in several productions, but each production was cast anew, often with guest stars from British television in leading roles, with varying degrees of success. The chorus and orchestra of the new company were much smaller than those of the old company: the chorus was reduced from 32 (or more) to 20, and the orchestra from 38 generally to 24. For a 1998 production of Pirates at the Queen's Theatre, the orchestra was even smaller: The Guardian wrote, "The goings-on in the pit are dispiriting. Budgetary constraints have forced the company to re-write the score for a band of nine instrumentalists. They play well enough, but every one of Sullivan's parodies loses its clout." The company received a modest Arts Council grant in 1997 to keep it afloat and turned to private funding from Raymond Gubbay for London seasons beginning in 1998. Despite the lean forces, the company received generally favourable reviews over the next five years under the management of Ian Martin. Some of its recordings have been well received. Many of these recordings also restore music that had been cut by Gilbert and Sullivan or the company over the decades. Gubbay felt over-committed by 2003 and pulled out. After fifteen years, with no Arts Council funding forthcoming, the company's last production was in May 2003.

The D'Oyly Carte Opera Trust later successfully claimed reimbursement of VAT paid during the 1990s, which allowed it to engage in co-productions. From May to July 2013, Scottish Opera produced a British touring production of The Pirates of Penzance in partnership with the trust (using the name D'Oyly Carte Opera Company). The trust next co-produced The Mikado with Scottish Opera on tour from May to July 2016. On 26 November 2019, the trust presented an evening of Gilbert and Sullivan at the Grand Theatre, Wolverhampton. The D'Oyly Carte Opera Company had opened the Grand in 1894 with a performance of Utopia, Limited and had returned there throughout the theatre's 125-year history. In 2021 and 2022, the trust co-produced The Gondoliers and a staged but concert-dress version of Utopia, Limited with Scottish Opera and State Opera South Australia, directed by Stuart Maunder and conducted by Derek Clark, starring Suart, Yvonne Howard, William Morgan, Mark Nathan, Charlie Drummond, Ben McAteer, Sioned Gwen Davies, Arthur Bruce, Catriona Hewitson and Dan Shelvey. In 2025 the trust co-produced with Scottish Opera and Opera Holland Park Trial by Jury in a double bill with the premiere of Emma Jenkins and Toby Hession's A Matter of Misconduct!, which toured Scotland in May and June before a London run at Opera Holland Park.

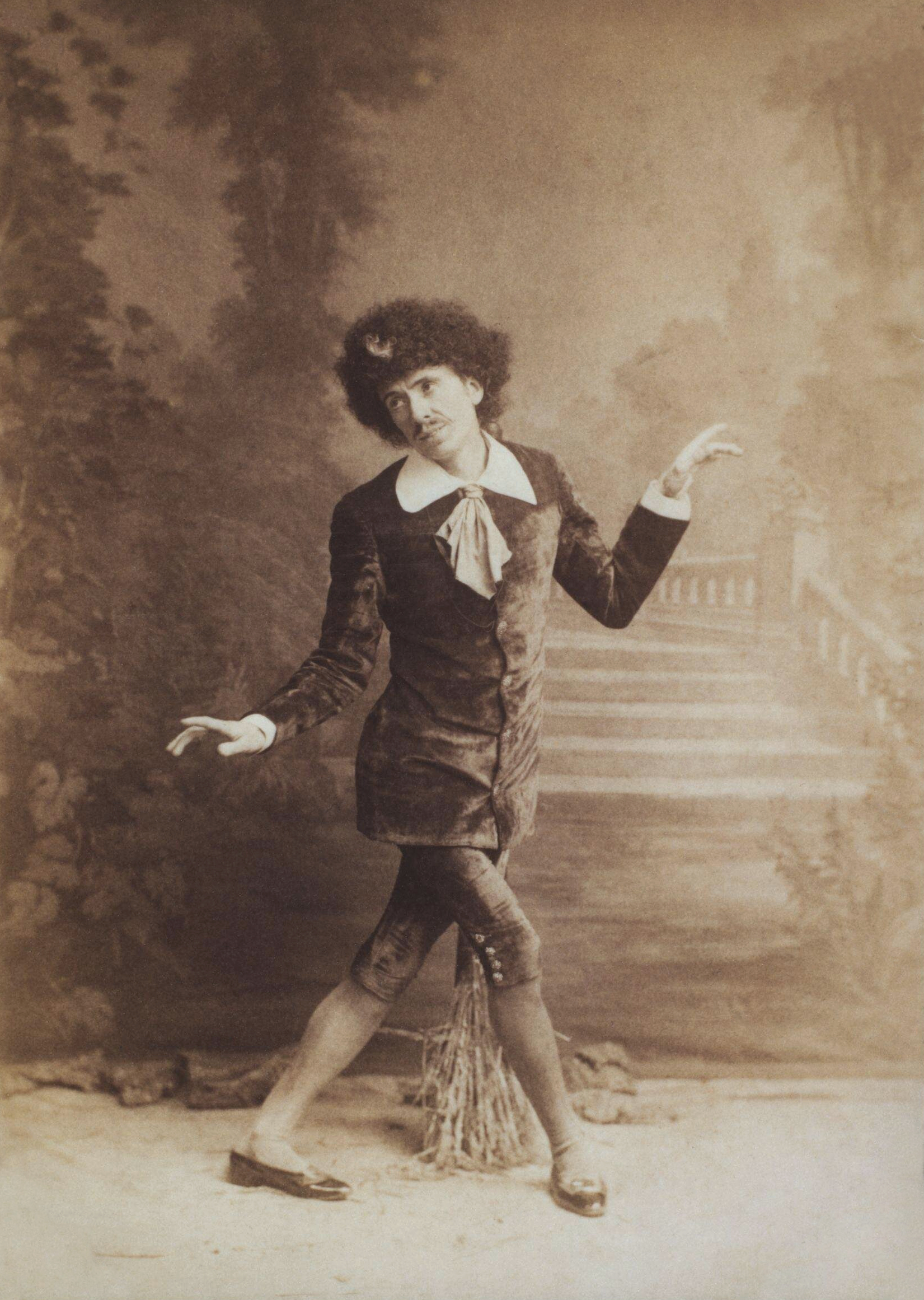
George Grossmith as Bunthorne in Patience

== Principal performers ==
Gilbert and Sullivan aficionados frequently use the names of the principal comedians of the D'Oyly Carte Opera Company to refer to time periods of the company's history. Thus, after the sudden death of Sullivan's brother Fred, who had created the role of the Learned Judge in Trial by Jury in 1875, the unknown George Grossmith was recruited in 1877. Before Grossmith left the company in 1889, he created the principal comic roles in nine of the operas, and so the principal comedian parts in the operas are often referred to as the "Grossmith" roles. Other performers who created a long series of roles in the original productions of the operas included the baritone Rutland Barrington, mezzo-soprano Jessie Bond, soprano Leonora Braham, contralto Rosina Brandram, tenor Durward Lely and bass-baritone Richard Temple. In the original New York City productions and British touring productions, the soprano Geraldine Ulmar, baritone Signor Brocolini, comic George Thorne and bass-baritone Fred Billington became particularly well known.

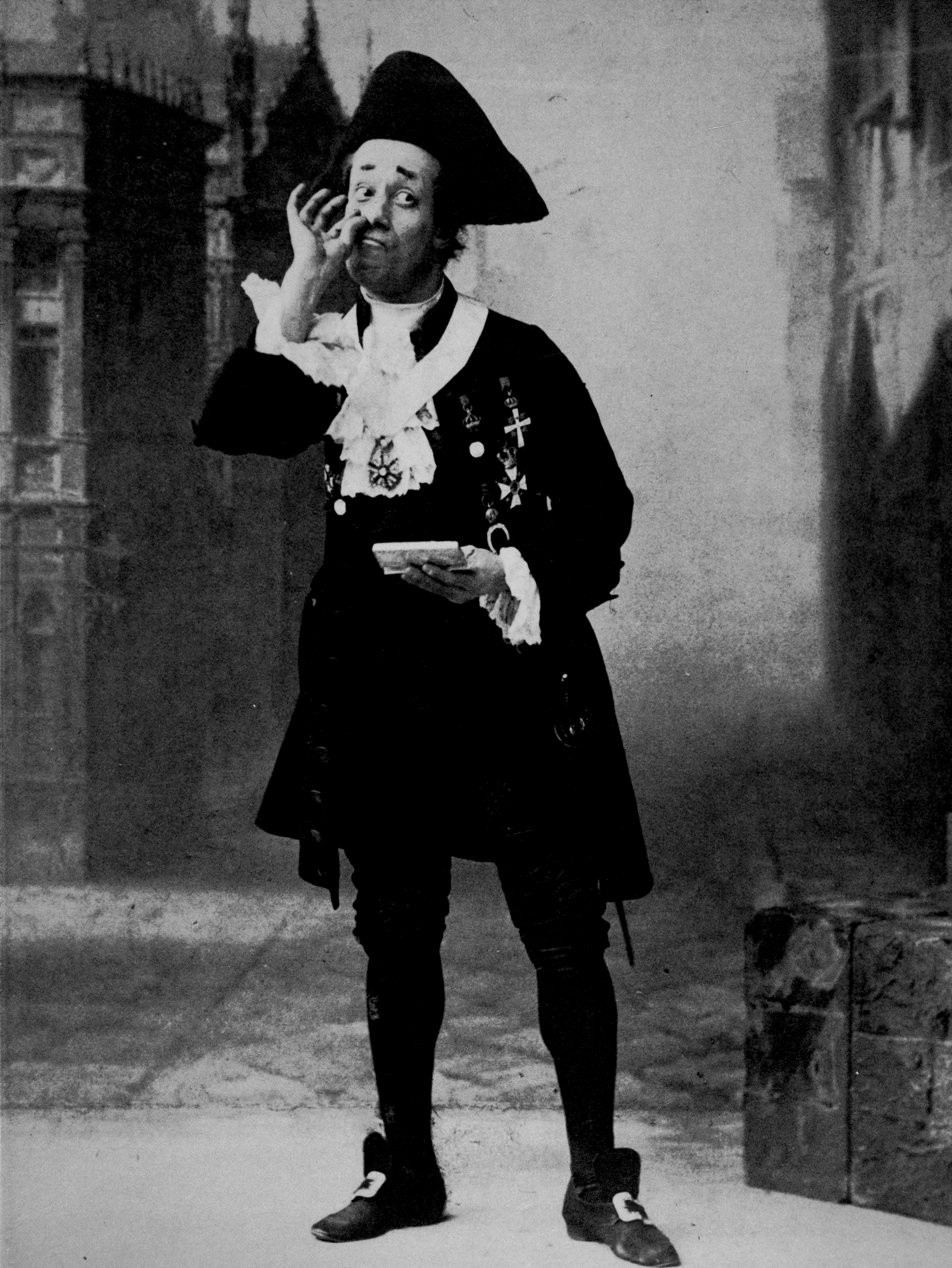
Passmore as Rudolph in The Grand Duke

After Grossmith left the company, the most notable players of his roles during the rest of Gilbert's lifetime were Walter Passmore (principal comedian from 1894 to 1903) and Charles H. Workman, who played the roles on tour with the company from 1897 and took over as principal comedian at the Savoy between 1906 and 1909. Both of these performers made recordings of songs from the Savoy operas. During the Passmore era, principal players of the company included Brandram and Barrington, as well as tenor Robert Evett, soprano Isabel Jay, sopranos Ruth Vincent and Florence St. John, tenor Courtice Pounds and his sister, mezzo-soprano Louie Pounds. During Workman's tenure, principal players included contralto Louie René, soprano Clara Dow, Leo Sheffield, and a young Henry Lytton. No complete recordings of the operas were made that included active members of the company until the 1920s. Workman and W. S. Gilbert quarrelled over their production of Fallen Fairies in 1909, and Gilbert banned Workman from appearing in his works in Britain. It is likely that, otherwise, Workman would have continued as principal comedian of the company. Rupert D'Oyly Carte wrote to Workman in 1919 asking him to return to the company as principal comedian, but Workman declined.

From 1909 to 1934, the principal comedian was Henry Lytton, who had been playing a variety of roles with the company steadily since 1887. He received a knighthood for his performances during his long tenure with the company. Lytton's voice deteriorated during his later career, and when His Master's Voice embarked on a series of complete recordings of the operas after World War I, he was not invited to record most of his roles. Instead, the concert singer George Baker was brought in to substitute. Other performers from this period include the mezzo-soprano Nellie Briercliffe, bass-baritone Darrell Fancourt, who is estimated to have portrayed the Mikado of Japan more than 3,000 times, contralto Bertha Lewis, tenor Derek Oldham, soprano Elsie Griffin and baritones Leo Sheffield and Sydney Granville.

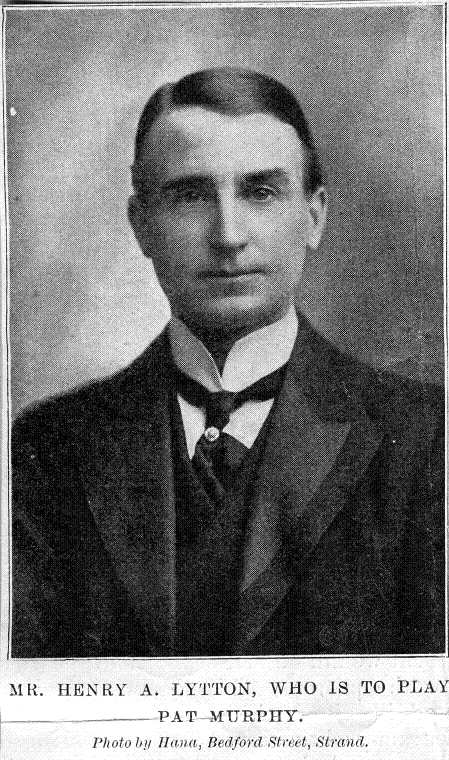
Henry Lytton, 1901

Lytton was succeeded in 1934 by Martyn Green, who played the principal comic parts until 1951, except for a gap from the end of 1939 to 1946, when Grahame Clifford replaced him. Green's time with the company is remembered for the early Decca recordings of the operas. During Green's tenure, in addition to the long-serving Fancourt, principal players included the baritone Richard Walker, soprano Helen Roberts, mezzo-soprano Marjorie Eyre, baritone Leslie Rands and contralto Ella Halman. Green was followed by Peter Pratt, who left the company in 1959, after more than eight years as principal comedian, still only 36 years old. During Pratt's years, principals included the bass-baritone Donald Adams, tenor Leonard Osborn (who later directed the company's productions), contralto Ann Drummond-Grant and mezzo-soprano Joyce Wright.

Pratt's successor was John Reed, who served as principal comedian for two decades. Other stars from this era were Thomas Round, Donald Adams, Gillian Knight, Valerie Masterson and Kenneth Sandford, all of whom, except the last, left the company for the wider operatic stage of Covent Garden, Sadler's Wells, English National Opera, Aix-en-Provence and elsewhere. When Reed left the company in 1979, his understudy James Conroy-Ward took over until the closure of the company in 1982.

From 1988, the revived company used guest artists for each production. The most regularly seen principal comedians were Eric Roberts and Richard Suart, both of whom also performed the "Grossmith" roles for other opera companies. Others included Sam Kelly, Jasper Carrott and Simon Butteriss.

== References in popular culture ==
In 1948 Flanders and Swann wrote a song called "In the D'Oyly Cart", a satire of the company and the rote "business" and gestures that it was accused of repeating. The song was first performed in the revue Oranges and Lemons (1948) and revived in Penny Plain (1951). It was broadcast in 1974 and included as the first track on the 1975 Flanders and Swann album, And Then We Wrote.

A one-act parody, called A "G. & S." Cocktail; or, A Mixed Savoy Grill, written by Lauri Wylie, with music by Herman Finck, premiered on 9 March 1925 at the London Hippodrome as part of the revue Better Days. It was also broadcast by the BBC. It concerned a nightmare experienced by a D'Oyly Carte tenor. The company is mentioned in the 1937 musical I'd Rather Be Right, with a score by Rodgers & Hart and a book by George S. Kaufman and Moss Hart.

The 1953 film The Story of Gilbert and Sullivan is a biographical film about Gilbert and Sullivan, and depicts Richard D'Oyly Carte and many members of the D'Oyly Carte Opera Company, as well as many of the company's productions from the 1870s and 1880s. The 1999 film Topsy-Turvy, directed by Mike Leigh, also depicts the company, focusing on the events leading up to and through the composition and production of The Mikado. The film was ranked on Empire's 2008 list of the 500 greatest movies of all time, created by polling 10,000 readers.

Series of cigarette cards were issued by Player's cigarette company depicting characters from the Savoy operas wearing the costumes used by the D'Oyly Carte Opera Company, and numerous postcards were published with photos or illustrations of D'Oyly Carte performers and scenes from the operas. A children's theatre company in London is called "Oily Cart", a play on the name of the company.

== Notes, references and sources ==
=== Sources ===
- Ainger, Michael (2002). Gilbert and Sullivan – A Dual Biography. Oxford: Oxford University Press. ISBN 0-19-514769-3.
- Bettany, Clemence (1975). The D'Oyly Carte Centenary Book (souvenir booklet). London: D'Oyly Carte Opera Company.
- Bradley, Ian (1996). The Complete Annotated Gilbert and Sullivan. New York: Oxford University Press. ISBN 0-19-816503-X.
- Bradley, Ian (2005). Oh Joy! Oh Rapture! The Enduring Phenomenon of Gilbert and Sullivan. New York: Oxford University Press. ISBN 0-19-516700-7.
- Fargis, Paul (1998). The New York Public Library Desk Reference – 3rd Edition. Macmillan General Reference. ISBN 0-02-862169-7.
- Cellier, François; Cunningham Bridgeman (1914). Gilbert and Sullivan and Their Operas. Boston: Little, Brown and Company. OCLC 459156009.
- Dark, Sidney; Grey, Rowland (1923). W. S. Gilbert: His Life and Letters. Ayer Publishing. ISBN 0-405-08430-7.
- Grossmith, George (1888). A Society Clown: Reminiscences. Bristol/London: Arrowsmith. Archived from the original on 1 October 2009. Accessed 9 March 2008
- Jacobs, Arthur (1986). Arthur Sullivan: A Victorian Musician. Oxford: Oxford University Press. ISBN 0-19-282033-8.
- Jones, John Bush (2003). Our Musicals Ourselves. Waltham, MA: Brandeis University Press. ISBN 1-58465-311-6.
- Joseph, Tony (1994). The D'Oyly Carte Opera Company, 1875–1982: An Unofficial History. London: Bunthorne Books. ISBN 0-9507992-1-1
- Joseph, Tony (2007). Leonard Osborn. Bunthorne Books. ISBN 978-0-9507992-8-5.
- Laurence, Dan H., ed. (1989). Shaw's Music – The Complete Musical Criticism of Bernard Shaw. vol. II, London: Max Reinhardt. ISBN 0-370-30249-4
- Mander, Raymond; Joe Mitchenson (1962). A Picture History of Gilbert and Sullivan. London: Vista Books.
- Rollins, Cyril; R. John Witts (1961). The D'Oyly Carte Opera Company in Gilbert and Sullivan Operas. London: Michael Joseph, Ltd. OCLC 1317843.
- Stedman, Jane W. (1996). W. S. Gilbert, A Classic Victorian & His Theatre. Oxford; New York: Oxford University Press. ISBN 0-19-816174-3.
- Wilson, Robin; Frederic Lloyd (1984). Gilbert & Sullivan – The Official D'Oyly Carte Picture History. London: Weidenfeld and Nicolson. ISBN 0-297-78505-2.
- Wolfson, John (1976). Final curtain: The last Gilbert and Sullivan Operas. London: Chappell in association with A. Deutsch. ISBN 0-903443-12-0.
- Gilbert and Sullivan Journal, vol. VII, p. 23 (May 1953), London: The Gilbert and Sullivan Society.
