= Edward Goodyear =

Edward Goodyear is a florist, located on 6 Cathedral Walk, Cardinal Place in London.

== History ==
The company was founded in 1879 by Edward Goodyear and was originally located in the Royal Arcade on Bond Street. It suffered heavy damage by bombs during World War II and moved to Brook Street next to Claridge's Hotel.

Jenifer Emery became chairwoman of the company in the 1980s. In 2005, together with her son Alistair Emery, she acquired the company from Claridge's and has since relocated the business to Cardinal Place in Victoria.

Edward Goodyear has enjoyed patronage from Queen Victoria. The company was granted a Royal Warrant of Appointment as her florist from Queen Elizabeth II in 1955, and from Prince Philip, Duke of Edinburgh in 1978. Jenifer Emery and Derek Goodyear, Edward Goodyear's grandson, hold these warrants personally and make them available to Edward Goodyear.
