= Eleanor Evans =

British singer, actress and stage director

Eleanor Evans in about 1950

Eleanor Evans (1893 – 20 December 1969) was a Welsh actress, singer and stage director. She performed in the Gilbert and Sullivan operas for over a span of more than 20 years with the D'Oyly Carte Opera Company. In 1949, she was appointed as the company's Stage Director and Director of Productions, continuing in those positions until 1953, but she proved to be unpopular with actors whom she directed because of her inflexibility and strict devotion to the traditional staging and comic business that had been used by the company for decades.

== Early years ==
Evans was born in Henllan, Denbighshire, the middle daughter of John Evans, a veterinarian who specialised in gelding horses. She had four brothers and two sisters. Her elder sister was the opera singer Laura Evans-Williams. Evans studied at the Royal Academy of Music, as did her future husband, the bass-baritone Darrell Fancourt, with whom she sang at a Royal Academy concert in May 1914. They married in January 1917.

Fancourt joined the D'Oyly Carte Opera Company as a principal in 1920, and Evans followed him into the company as a chorister in 1921. Evans, who acquired the nickname "Snookie", first played the role of the Plaintiff in Trial by Jury later that year. According to fellow D'Oyly Carte performer Derek Oldham, "Oh, she was so beautiful, was Snookie! We all fell for her, and we gave Darrell a busy time keeping us 'off'." Evans continued singing in the chorus until 1923 and also was given the small role of Ada in Princess Ida. She again sang the Plaintiff during 1924, and also played the larger role of Lady Psyche in Princess Ida. Occasionally, she also filled in as Josephine in H.M.S. Pinafore. She continued to play the Plaintiff and Psyche in the 1925–26 season. After that, she returned to the chorus but on occasion she filled in as Psyche and as Gianetta in The Gondoliers during the next season. From 1927 to 1937, she sang only in the chorus. She left the company in July 1937, but returned from 1941 to 1945, again singing in the chorus.

== Stage director ==
Soon after Bridget D'Oyly Carte inherited the company, in 1949, she appointed Evans as Stage Director and Director of Productions to replace Anna Bethell (Mrs. Sydney Granville). The choice of the temperamental Snookie, the wife of a leading principal with the company, was a highly unpopular one and contributed to a wave of defections from the company culminating in 1951. One of the most important stars to leave the company was principal comedian Martyn Green. He wrote in his 1952 memoir:

I had heard there was some possibility of [the selection of Evans] happening and ... told Miss Carte that I thought she was making a great psychological error. During Anna Bethell's regime ... there had been growing signs of discontent and suggestions of favouritism being shown to some of the members of the chorus in respect to passing over existing understudies, selections for small parts, and so on. ... But to appoint not only a woman who had for fifteen years worked in the chorus alongside several who were now principals, but the wife of one of the main principals, seemed to me to be a psychological error of the first magnitude. I felt that ... she would, rightly or wrongly, be accused of that very same favouritism. My views made no impression on Miss Carte, but time was to prove that I was right. Discontent grew, changes were constantly taking place, and criticism became rampant. Nor did it stop at the methods of production; it went so far as to suggest a complete lack of knowledge, evidenced ... by constant self-contradiction. There were other accusations levelled against her, of a more serious nature. ... [Those] in control ... apparently assumed in the first place that the performers are little more than automatons and are completely devoid of brains or the ability to think for themselves. Production is done to a plan that takes no consideration of the individual, his personality or his histrionic ability – a stereotyped plan that results in a clockwork performance devoid of spontaneity.

Evans, with the D'Oyly Carte Opera Company at the end of its 1926 London season, in the second row at left, peeking over Bertha Lewis's shoulder.

Historian Tony Joseph writes: "Green was not the only member of the Company to leave. ... Ella Halman left too. So did Richard Watson ... Margaret Mitchell ... Radley Flynn and no fewer than twenty-two other small part players and choristers. It was the largest single exodus of performers in D'Oyly Carte history, and that was why the sense of sadness that hovered over the season was so marked. ... August 1951 was the end of an era." Cynthia Morey, who joined the Company just before the mass exodus writes: "I have never found out precisely why this great exodus took place. ... We were always under the impression that we should feel honoured to be in the employ of the D’Oyly Carte Opera Company; it was patently obvious that the management held firmly to the policy that nobody is indispensable". Morey also writes:

[Snookie]'s career in the company commenced as a chorister [and small part player]. In 1927 she was apparently demoted to the chorus, and there she remained for [fifteen years]. Then, in 1949, under the grand name of Stage Director we find the name: Eleanor Evans. I should not have thought these qualifications sufficient for such an important post; to spend all those years as a chorister seems to signify a lack of ambition or achievement. But I suppose a 'Director of productions' in those days merely needed to know every move and every gesture, and exactly when they occurred, for no departure from the set production was ever permitted.

Soprano Shirley Hall said: "All she did was just show you the moves – you never had any real direction ... you just got told to do what everybody had done for years ... carbon copy performances. ... [T]he inflections and everything had to be exactly as prescribed." Richard Walker and others also criticised Evans's temperament and methods. She retired as stage director in 1953, the year that her husband retired and died, but she coached new D'Oyly Carte principals in their roles for some years thereafter. One of these was Kenneth Sandford, who wrote, "It took me about two years to get rid of the shackles of [her direction]". She was replaced as Director of Productions by Robert Gibson.

She died in Colwyn Bay, Wales, in 1969, aged 76.
