= Frederic Lloyd =

British theatre producer (1918–1995)

Lloyd (left) with Osbert Lancaster at the launch of D'Oyly Carte's revival of The Sorcerer in 1971

Frederic Lloyd OBE (1 July 1918 – 27 July 1995) was an English theatre manager. Most notably, he was the General Manager of the D'Oyly Carte Opera Company from 1951 until its closure in 1982.

== Biography ==
Lloyd was born on 1 July 1918, into an ecclesiastical family near Oxford, England. During the Second World War he worked with the Council for the Encouragement of Music and the Arts, the precursor of the Arts Council.

In 1951, Lloyd was a director of the Festival of Britain, and in September of that year he was appointed General Manager of the D'Oyly Carte Opera Company and of the Savoy Theatre, in succession to Alfred Nightingale. In addition to his D'Oyly Carte duties, Lloyd was a member of the council of management of the Royal Philharmonic Orchestra and played an important part in saving the orchestra's tour of America in 1963 at a critical time in the RPO's fortunes. From 1961 to 1982, he was also secretary of the D'Oyly Carte Opera Trust. In 1966 he was elected President of the Theatrical Managers' Association.

With D'Oyly Carte's closure, Lloyd retired from theatre management, although he continued to sit on numerous committees. He was chairman of the governors of the Royal Academy of Music from 1980 to 1983, and trustee and chairman of the general committee of the Garrick Club from 1976 to 1984. He wrote articles on Elgar and Beethoven, and he collaborated with Robin Wilson on an official history of the D'Oyly Carte Company in 1984.

On his retirement, Lloyd moved from his London home in St John's Wood to the village of Strathpeffer, Scotland, near Inverness, where he became a lay-preacher at his local church. His wife Valerie died in 1991. They had two sons. He died on 27 July 1995, aged 77, in Inverness.
