= Fisher Morgan =

Welsh singer and actor

Fisher Morgan as Shadbolt in The Yeomen of the Guard

Thomas Fisher Morgan (1908 – 18 January 1959) was a Welsh singer and actor best remembered as a principal bass-baritone with the D'Oyly Carte Opera Company during the 1950s.

Morgan studied music at London's Trinity College of Music and began his career in concert work and radio. He broadcast on the BBC Forces network during World War II. From 1951 to 1956, he became a principal player with the D'Oyly Carte, recording three of his roles for Decca. After leaving the company, he played in pantomime. He died suddenly at the age of 50.

== Life and career ==
Born in Glamorgan in Wales, Morgan participated as a youth in amateur productions of Gilbert and Sullivan, playing the role of Sergeant Meryll in The Yeomen of the Guard at the age of 17. He studied at Trinity College of Music in London, and, while still a student, he appeared in recitals and broadcast for the BBC in regional programmes. In 1939, The Observer wrote of him, "a fine discovery ... who should very soon develop into a singer Glyndebourne would be proud to possess." During World War II, Morgan broadcast on the BBC Forces network. His concert work included the bass lead in Bach's St. Matthew Passion in 1940, and in British works by composers from Henry Purcell to Hubert Parry.

Jeffrey Skitch (l) with Morgan and Peter Pratt (r) in The Mikado

In April 1951, Morgan was engaged by the D'Oyly Carte Opera Company, immediately taking on the roles of Sergeant Bouncer in Cox and Box, and the Lieutenant of the Tower in The Yeomen of the Guard, and understudying, and occasionally performing, the roles of Private Willis in Iolanthe, Pooh-Bah in The Mikado, Wilfred Shadbolt in The Yeomen of the Guard, and Don Alhambra in The Gondoliers. In the autumn of that year, after the departure of the company's principal bass-baritone, Richard Watson, Morgan began to regularly perform the roles of the Learned Judge in Trial by Jury, the Sergeant of Police in The Pirates of Penzance, Private Willis in Iolanthe, Pooh-Bah in The Mikado, Sir Despard in Ruddigore, Wilfred in Yeomen and Don Alhambra in The Gondoliers. In 1954, when the company revived Princess Ida, he also took on the part of King Hildebrand, having dropped the role of Bouncer the previous year. In his final D'Oyly Carte season, which ended in April 1956, he gave up the role of the Judge. The record producer Chris Webster wrote that Morgan "must be one of the best Pooh-Bahs ever". In The Manchester Guardian, Edward Greenfield wrote of Morgan's Don Alhambra, "His ability to overact pompously is unrivalled, and more than anyone else last night he managed to project his personality to everyone in the audience." Of the 1955 recording of Princess Ida, Mel Moratti commented, "Fisher Morgan, as King Hildebrand, has the most stunning voice I have heard for some time". A 1973 article in The Savoyard magazine ranked Sir Despard as Morgan's greatest role: "his grisly first entrance [was] brilliantly contrasted with just the right degree of sobriety and sedateness in Act II ... a superb performance of singing and dancing."

After leaving D'Oyly Carte, Morgan appeared in pantomime. He played the role of the Emperor of China for three seasons in Aladdin at three different theatres. These were the London Palladium (1956–57, with Sonnie Hale and Norman Wisdom), at Nottingham (1957–58), and at the Empire Theatre Liverpool (1958–59). On 18 January 1959, returning to his home in Cheam, Surrey, after a performance of Aladdin, Morgan died suddenly, aged 50.

== Recordings and broadcasts ==
For the D'Oyly Carte Opera Company, Morgan recorded early Decca LP recordings as Private Willis in Iolanthe (1952), Sir Marmaduke Pointdextre in The Sorcerer (1953) and King Hildebrand in Princess Ida (1955). Morgan also participated in radio broadcasts by the company. For Sir Thomas Beecham, Morgan recorded the role of Luther in Offenbach's The Tales of Hoffmann (1947 soundtrack recording for the 1951 film).
