= Peter Pratt =

British opera singer and actor (1923–1995)

Peter Pratt as Bunthorne in Patience

Peter Pratt (21 March 1923 – 11 January 1995) was an English actor and singer. He was best known for his comic roles in the Gilbert and Sullivan comic operas.

Pratt started his career in the chorus of the D'Oyly Carte Opera Company in 1945, moving up to small roles and then understudying Martyn Green, the principal comedian. From 1951 to 1959, he was the company's principal comedian, earning critical praise in the famous "patter" roles. After leaving the company, he moved on to a career in theatre, television, concert and radio, although he continued to perform the Gilbert and Sullivan roles throughout his career.

Among his television roles Pratt was the second actor to play the Master in the science fiction series Doctor Who.

== Biography ==
Pratt was born and grew up in Eastbourne, England, where he began to study singing as a child and was a soloist in his church choir. He was also involved in amateur theatrical societies.

=== D'Oyly Carte years ===
Jeffrey Skitch (l) with Fisher Morgan and Pratt (r) in The Mikado

Peter Pratt joined the D'Oyly Carte Opera Company in the chorus in September 1945, at the age of 22. He began to play small roles with the company in 1947, including Go-To in The Mikado. In the 1948–49 season, he became second understudy to Martyn Green and continued to play several of the smaller roles, including Bouncer in Cox and Box, Bill Bobstay in H.M.S. Pinafore and Major Murgatroyd in Patience. He got his big break when he was called upon to play Robin Oakapple in Ruddigore on short notice in May 1949 (and several of the other "patter" roles that summer), when both Green and the principal understudy fell ill. He was soon given the primary understudy responsibilities, filling in for most of the comic "patter" roles, as well as playing several of the other smaller roles from time to time.

In September 1951, exactly six years after joining the company, Pratt became the principal comedian following Green's departure, and he served in that capacity for the next eight seasons, playing Sir Joseph Porter in Pinafore, the Major-General in The Pirates of Penzance, Bunthorne in Patience, the Lord Chancellor in Iolanthe, Ko-Ko in The Mikado, Robin in Ruddigore, Jack Point in The Yeomen of the Guard, the Duke of Plaza-Toro in The Gondoliers and King Gama in Princess Ida. In 1953, his first London season as principal comedian, The Times reviewed him in the role of the Lord Chancellor: "Mr. Peter Pratt... had a good delivery, a quiet manner, and a nimble pair of legs that contrasted suddenly and superbly with his dry demeanour. He refrained from overplaying the part". In reviewing a 1956 Ruddigore, The Times wrote, "Mr. Pratt showed true operatic talent in the [twin roles] changing the colour of his tone and the expression of his face with decisive skill." In a 1957 review, a correspondent for The Times called Pratt's Jack Point, in Yeomen, "very human, not over-dramatized".

Pratt suffered an illness in the spring of 1959, and in May he announced that he had decided not to rejoin the company the next season. His last appearance with the company was on 30 May 1959. During his tenure with the D'Oyly Carte Opera Company, Pratt recorded the roles of Major Murgatroyd (Patience, 1951), John Wellington Wells (The Sorcerer, 1953), King Gama (Princess Ida, 1955), Ko-Ko (The Mikado, 1957), and Major-General Stanley (Pirates, 1957).

=== Later years ===
After leaving the D'Oyly Carte organisation, Pratt turned his attention to theatre, television, concert, and radio work. In 1964, for example, he appeared in All in Love, a musical based on Sheridan's The Rivals. In 1965, he was seen in the comic play A Month in the Country at the Cambridge Theatre in London. He was a member of the BBC Drama Repertory Company in the early 1960s.

In 1966, BBC Radio presented a complete cycle of the thirteen extant Gilbert and Sullivan operas, with dialogue, with Pratt starring in ten of them and working behind the scenes as co-producer. His love of Gilbert and Sullivan continued during his later career, and he frequently turned to their operas for inspiration. As a writer, narrator, and performer he presented a television play called Jack Point (1973), and radio programmes such as Afternoon at the Savoy, Evening at the Savoy, and Take a Sparkling Pair. Pratt also toured his own companies, "Music Mosaic" and "The World of Gilbert and Sullivan" presenting Gilbert and Sullivan and other works to audiences in Britain, North America, and Australia. He appeared in a full costume production of The Mikado at Royal Albert Hall. As part of the 1975 centennial season, before the first of the four performances of Trial by Jury, a specially-written curtain raiser by William Douglas-Home, called Dramatic Licence, was played by Pratt as Richard D'Oyly Carte, Kenneth Sandford as Gilbert and John Ayldon as Sullivan, in which Gilbert, Sullivan and Carte plan the birth of Trial in 1875.

In 1976, Pratt appeared in the serial The Deadly Assassin from the BBC's long-running science fiction television series Doctor Who, becoming the second actor to play the Master. Pratt received praise for the performance, which relied heavily on his voice because of the restrictive nature of his mask and costume. In 1977, Pratt appeared with Hinge and Bracket in an episode of "The Stackton Music Festival, A sonic jamboree" for BBC Radio. In 1981, he toured with a group called the "London Savoyards". He also appeared as a soloist in the concert video recording "Gilbert & Sullivan Present their Greatest Hits," made at Royal Albert Hall in 1982.

Pratt died in London in 1995, aged 71.

== Personal life ==
Pratt was married to D'Oyly Carte soubrette Joyce Wright during his days with that company. He later married Patience Sheffield, a BBC drama Studio Manager and daughter of former D'Oyly Carte baritone Leo Sheffield.

== Filmography ==
- The Stackton Music Festival The Enchanting World of Hinge & Bracket TV – Himself
- The Ordeal of Richard Feverel (1964) TV – Peter Brayder
- The Edwardians (1972) TV – Charlie Coburn
- Van der Valk Blue Notes (1972) TV – Westermann
- Murder Must Advertise (1973) TV – Mr. Pym
- The Brontes of Haworth (1973) TV – Mr. Woolven
- Menace The Solarium (1973) TV – Singer
- Play for Today Jack Point (1973) TV – Fenner
- Z-Cars Cadet (1973) TV – Fisherman
- Fall of Eagles (1974) TV – Singer
- Doctor Who The Deadly Assassin (1976) TV – The Master
- The Story of Ruth (1981) – Dr. Peter Ferris
- Squadron The Veteran (1982) TV – Len Travis
- The Best of Gilbert and Sullivan (1983) (V) – Soloist
