= John Ayldon =

English singer and actor

John Ayldon, bass-baritone

John Ayldon (11 December 1943 – 16 February 2013) was an English opera singer and comic actor, best known for his performances in bass-baritone roles of the Savoy Operas with the D'Oyly Carte Opera Company.

Though born in England, Ayldon spent several years of his youth in the US, where he became interested in acting and received some professional engagements. He performed in Gilbert and Sullivan productions later in London but did not begin his professional performing career in earnest until 1967, when he joined the D'Oyly Carte as a chorister and small role player. In 1969, he took over the principal bass-baritone roles in the company's entire repertoire, and he continued to play them full-time until the company closed in 1982.

After this, he sang roles with opera companies throughout Britain and with Canadian Opera; he appeared frequently in concerts, music hall, cabaret, and pantomime. In London's West End, he understudied and played the role of Firmin in The Phantom of the Opera and played the Pope in Which Witch. Ayldon was a guest artist with the revived D'Oyly Carte Opera Company on its tour to California and toured with such Gilbert and Sullivan concert groups as "The Magic of D'Oyly Carte" and "The Best of Gilbert & Sullivan".

== Life and career ==
John Ayldon was born as John Arnold in London. He moved to San Francisco, California in 1954 with his elder sister Molly, where he went to school. He became interested in the theatre, appearing in many school productions, and received some professional engagements, including appearing in the title role in a television production of Huckleberry Finn. He returned to England in 1958, where he joined the Eltham Little Theatre and other societies, performing in Gilbert and Sullivan shows, among others. For several years after leaving school, he worked in journalism, shipping and advertising.

=== D'Oyly Carte ===
Ayldon joined the D'Oyly Carte Opera Company as a member of the chorus in 1967. The following season, he began to play the small role of the Associate in Trial by Jury and filled in on occasion as Sergeant Bouncer in Cox and Box, the Learned Judge in Trial, and the Boatswain in H.M.S. Pinafore. In 1968, he began to understudy Donald Adams in the principal bass-baritone roles, appearing on occasion as Dick Deadeye in Pinafore, the Pirate King in The Pirates of Penzance, the Earl of Mountararat in Iolanthe, and the title role in The Mikado. He changed his name to Ayldon because another Equity member was known as John Arnold.

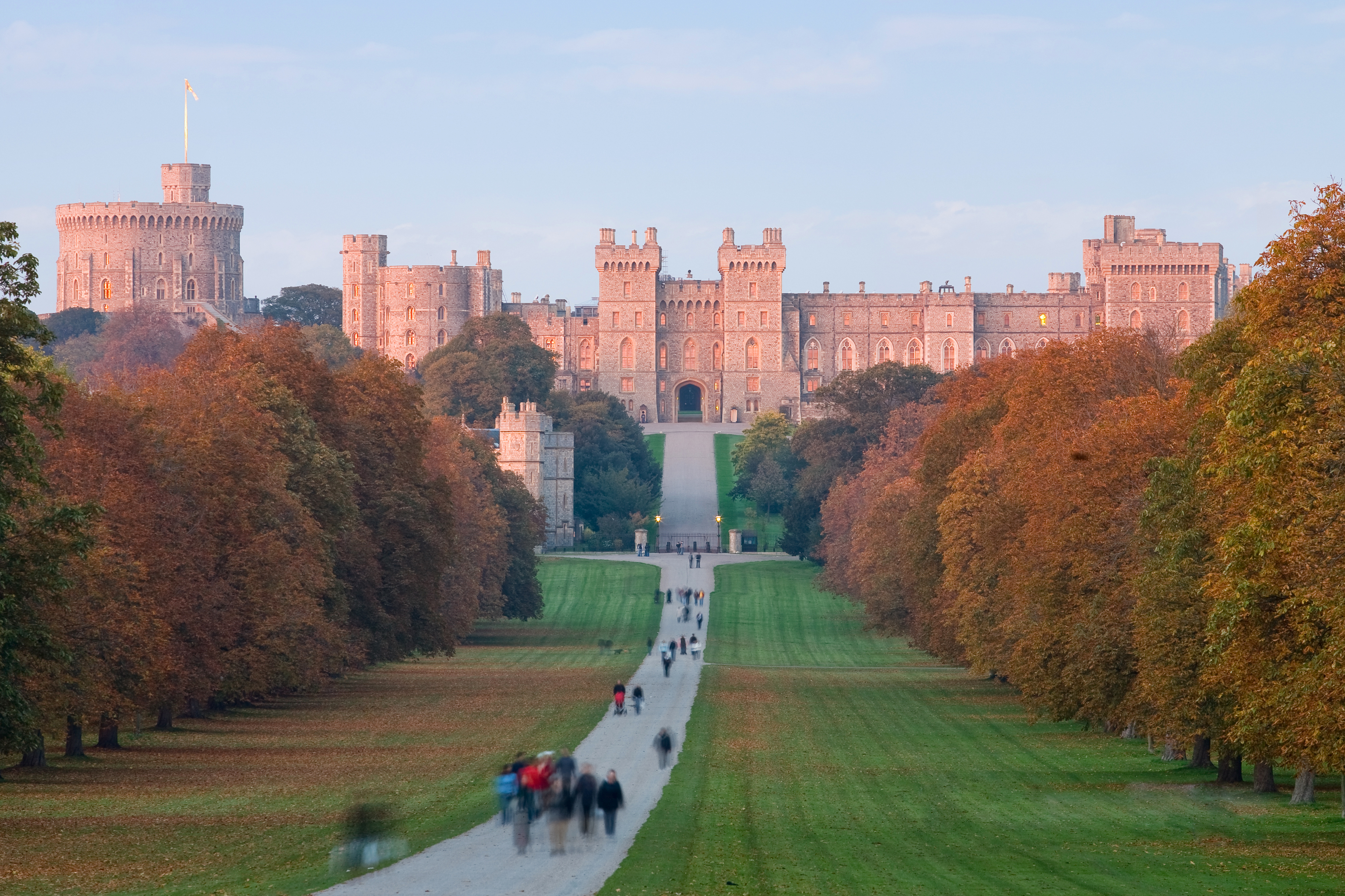
Ayldon performed at a Jubilee Year Royal Command Performance at Windsor Castle in 1977

When Adams left the company in 1969, Ayldon took over as Deadeye, Pirate King, Colonel Calverley in Patience, Mountararat, Arac in Princess Ida, the Mikado, Sir Roderic Murgatroyd in Ruddigore, and Sergeant Meryll in The Yeomen of the Guard. Later that year, he added Sergeant Bouncer in Cox and Box (only for a few years), and the following year added Sir Marmaduke Pointdextre in The Sorcerer. With D'Oyly Carte, Ayldon gave up to 350 performances a year. His obituary in The Telegraph commented, "Blessed with a wide schoolboy grin and a spark of mischief, Ayldon tended towards roles which demonstrated a degree of villainy."

For the 1975 D'Oyly Carte Centenary Celebration, Ayldon played all his principal bass-baritone roles as well as Phantis in Utopia Limited and the Prince of Monte Carlo in The Grand Duke (in concert). As part of the 1975 centennial season, before the first of the four performances of Trial by Jury, a specially-written curtain raiser by William Douglas-Home, called Dramatic Licence, was played by Peter Pratt as Richard D'Oyly Carte, Kenneth Sandford as Gilbert and Ayldon as Sullivan, in which Gilbert, Sullivan and Carte plan the premiere of Trial in 1875. In 1977, Ayldon played before Queen Elizabeth II and other members of the Royal Family for the queen's Silver Jubilee Command Performance of H.M.S. Pinafore at Windsor Castle.

Ayldon continued to play his regular roles through the remaining years of the D'Oyly Carte Opera Company, except that in 1977 (at his request) he swapped Florian for Arac in Princess Ida. The Prince of Monte Carlo's "roulette song" became a favourite concert piece of Ayldon's, and he sang it, among other pieces, on the Last Night of the D'Oyly Carte on 27 February 1982.

=== Later years ===
After 1982, Ayldon remained active in musical theatre and opera. He appeared in principal roles with Canadian Opera, Welsh National Opera, Dublin Grand Opera, and New Sadler's Wells Opera. His operatic roles included Geronimo in Il Matrimonio Segreto, the title role in Don Pasquale, Sacristan in Tosca, Frank in Die Fledermaus, Schaunard in La bohème, Concian in I quatro rusteghi and Otec Paloucký in The Kiss. He appeared frequently in concerts, music hall, cabaret, and pantomime. He made his debut in a West End musical in The Phantom of the Opera, understudying Firmin, and subsequently other roles in that musical, and followed this by playing the Pope in Which Witch. In 1988, he sang the role of Major Murgatroyd in a concert performance of Act II of Patience at The Proms. He was a guest artist with the revived D'Oyly Carte Opera Company on its tour to California, playing Pooh-Bah in The Mikado, and also with "The Magic of D'Oyly Carte".

Ayldon toured North America frequently with Kenneth Sandford, Geoffrey Shovelton, Lorraine Daniels, and others in the 1990s with a concert programme of G&S favourites called "The Best of Gilbert & Sullivan" or "G&S à la Carte", often conducted by John Owen Edwards. In the late 1990s and early years of the 2000s, he performed and spoke at the annual International Gilbert and Sullivan Festival and appeared regularly at Gawsworth Old Hall in Cheshire. He enjoyed cooking and was knowledgeable about "theatre, film and opera – especially Verdi and Donizetti" and cultivated acquaintances with Joan Sutherland and Leontyne Price, with whom he corresponded. Ayldon's partner was the tenor Guy Matthews, another former member of the D'Oyly Carte Opera Company, since 1975; the two entered into a civil partnership in 2007.

Ayldon died at the age of 69 in Northampton.

== Recordings ==
Ayldon's roles recorded with D'Oyly Carte included Dick Deadeye in Pinafore (1971), the title role in The Mikado (1973), Mountararat in Iolanthe (1974), the Foreman in Trial (1975), Phantis in Utopia Limited (1976), the Prince of Monte Carlo in The Grand Duke (1976), Mr. Grinder in The Zoo (1978), and Sergeant Meryll in Yeomen (1979). He also recorded Old Adam in Ruddigore for New Sadler's Wells Opera (1987), appeared as Dick Deadeye in the D'Oyly Carte 1973 TV production of H.M.S. Pinafore, and was a soloist in the concert video recording "Gilbert & Sullivan's Greatest Hits" at the Royal Albert Hall in 1982. He sang the role of "The Pope" on the 1993 London cast album of Which Witch (NBCD 015).
