= Joyce Wright =

British singer and actress (1922–2020)

Betty Joyce Wright (23 June 1922 – 26 August 2020) was a British singer and actress, best known for her performances in the principal mezzo-soprano roles of the Savoy Operas with the D'Oyly Carte Opera Company. She was married for a time to another D'Oyly Carte star, Peter Pratt.

== Life and career ==
Wright was born in Leicester, England, but grew up in Glasgow, Scotland, where she attended Bearsden Academy and studied music from the age of eight. She and her family moved back to the English Midlands, where she won prizes at musical festivals and sang in choirs directed by Sir Malcolm Sargent and Ernest Nash. She also performed in amateur theatricals, including with the Glasgow Players. Wright also played the piano professionally for a dance orchestra.

She was engaged as a chorister by the D'Oyly Carte Opera Company in June 1947 in their repertory of the Gilbert and Sullivan comic operas. Soon thereafter, she began to play the small roles of Leila in Iolanthe and Peep-Bo in The Mikado, and filled in occasionally as Edith in The Pirates of Penzance and Lady Saphir in Patience. In 1948, she added a number of additional small roles and substituted briefly as Hebe in H.M.S. Pinafore, Edith in Pirates, Phoebe Meryll in The Yeomen of the Guard, and Tessa in The Gondoliers. She continued to play her small roles and to fill in as understudy for these larger roles, also substituting on occasion as Pitti-Sing in The Mikado, until 1951.

In 1951, Wright became the company's principal soubrette, playing the mezzo-soprano roles of Hebe, Edith, Lady Angela in Patience, the title role in Iolanthe, Pitti-Sing, Mad Margaret in Ruddigore, Phoebe and Tessa. She played these roles, for the next eleven years, except that Beryl Dixon played Lady Angela for several seasons. Wright was known in these roles "for charm and daintiness, while she had plenty of attack when necessary".

Wright left the D'Oyly Carte organisation in June 1962. She appeared in Yeomen in the 1962 Festival of the City of London at the Tower of London. She later appeared on BBC television and produced Gilbert and Sullivan works throughout England for amateur companies. She also designed, painted and sold lampshades with a Mikado motif. She was married for a time to D'Oyly Carte star Peter Pratt.

She died in August 2020 at the age of 98.

== Recordings ==
Wright's recordings with D'Oyly Carte included Kate (1949 Pirates), Giulia (1950 Gondoliers), Peep-Bo (1950 Mikado), Hebe (1960 Pinafore), and Tessa (1961 Gondoliers). She also sang Peep-Bo in a 1951 BBC broadcast of The Mikado and Tessa in a BBC production of Gondoliers in 1958 or 1959.

== Sources ==
- Ayre, Leslie (1972). The Gilbert & Sullivan Companion. London: W.H. Allen & Co Ltd.
