= Jeffrey Skitch =

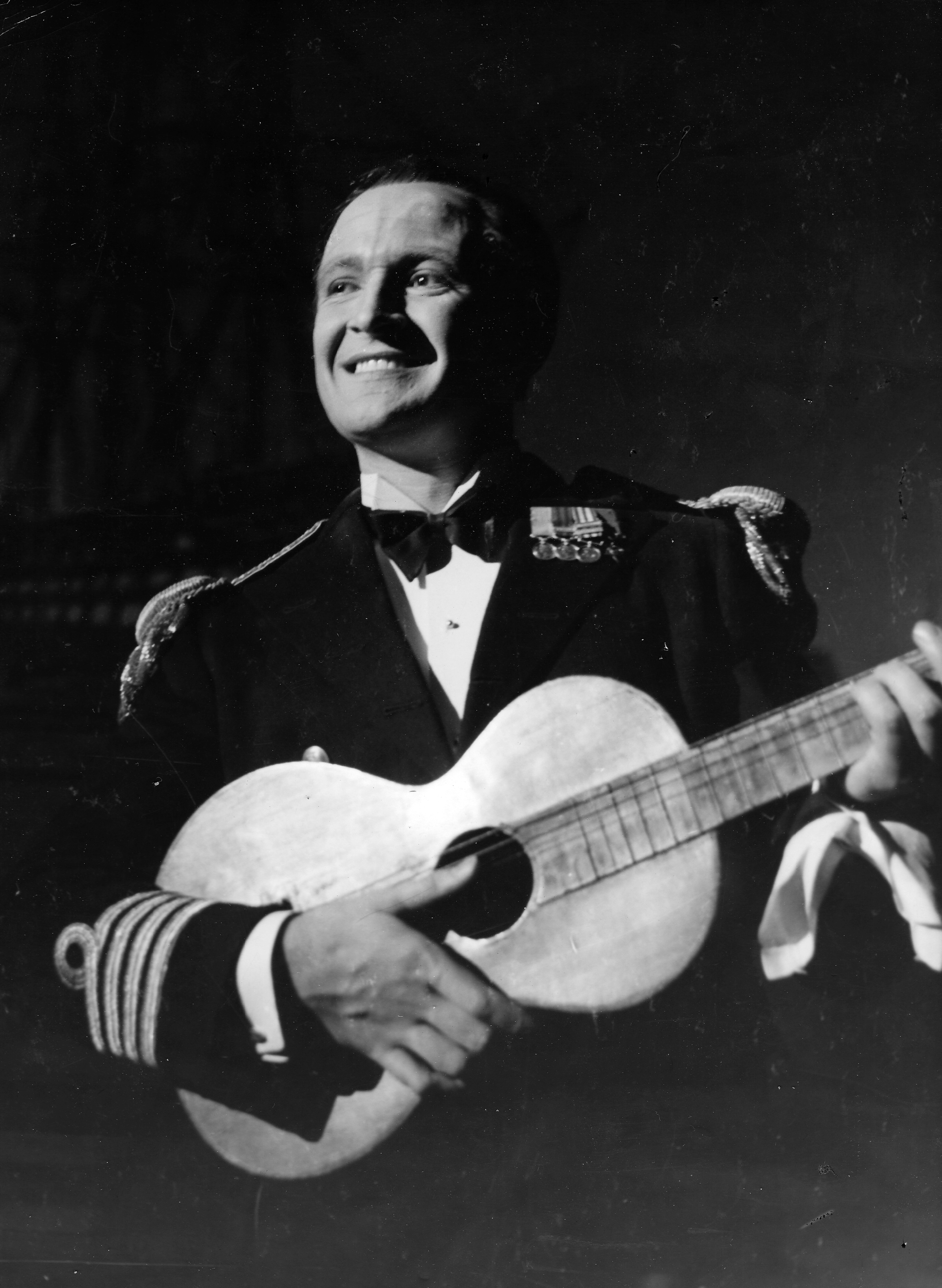
As Captain Corcoran in H.M.S. Pinafore circa 1960

Jeffrey Ralph Skitch (16 September 1927 – 7 March 2013) was an actor, operatic baritone and teacher best known for his performances and recordings with the D'Oyly Carte Opera Company from 1952 to 1965.

Born in Australia, Skitch moved with his mother to England when he was two years old. He served in the RAF during World War II and began acting by 1949. After his career with D'Oyly Carte, he turned to teaching, and from 1981 to 1995 he was the Principal of Elmhurst Ballet School.

== Early life and career ==
Skitch was born in Millicent, South Australia, the son of Ralph Aubrey Skitch (1896–1959), a land agent, and Magda Katie Helena Herman Skitch (1897–1959), who met in London during the First World War. The couple married in Australia in about 1920. In 1929, Skitch and his older brother Robert Ernest Skitch (1923–1999) travelled with their mother on a visit to London and did not return to Australia. His parents divorced, and his father remained in Australia, later remarrying. Skitch was educated in England. After National Service with the Royal Air Force during World War II and for two years thereafter, he trained as an actor and singer at the Royal Academy of Dramatic Art and The Old Vic Theatre School.

Skitch first performed professionally in London in 1949, in She Stoops to Conquer, as an extra at the Arts Theatre. That autumn, he served at the Arts Theatre as an assistant stage manager and actor in the play The Romantic Young Lady. He appeared in Idomeneo with the Glyndebourne Festival Opera in 1951.

He joined the D'Oyly Carte Opera Company for the 1952–53 season. His first roles with the company were Luiz in The Gondoliers and the small role of Second Yeoman in The Yeomen of the Guard. When Alan Styler temporarily left D'Oyly Carte later that year, Skitch began to share the larger role of Giuseppe in The Gondoliers and added to his repertory the roles of Archibald Grosvenor in Patience, Strephon in Iolanthe and Pish-Tush in The Mikado. The next season, Skitch added the role of Captain Corcoran in HMS Pinafore, the role for which he is perhaps best remembered (his Grosvenor – his favourite role – and his Pish Tush were also particularly admired), and also briefly appeared as Samuel in The Pirates of Penzance. During this period, he dropped the role of Strephon and switched back to Luiz in The Gondoliers. In 1954, he took over the role of Florian in Princess Ida and, in addition to his other roles, occasionally played Strephon. Except for a break from the company in the second half of 1957, Skitch played most of these roles until 1965, also sometimes playing the Counsel for the Plaintiff or the Learned Judge in Trial by Jury. The company toured extensively in Britain and also toured the US during these years.

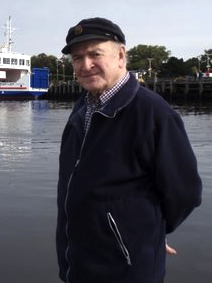
Jeffrey Skitch in February 2010

Skitch recorded several roles with D'Oyly Carte on the Decca label, including Doctor Daly in The Sorcerer (1953), Florian in Princess Ida (1955, 1965), Captain Corcoran in H.M.S. Pinafore (1960) and Luiz in The Gondoliers (1961). He also participated in several radio broadcasts with the company during his tenure. In 1975, during the company's centennial season, Skitch was invited to participate in the final performance of Trial by Jury, in which the regular D'Oyly Carte chorus was augmented by fourteen former stars of the company.

== Family, teaching career and later years ==
While touring with the D'Oyly Carte Opera Company in Los Angeles, Skitch met an American singer, Stella Maria Hawley, and the two married in the Actors' Church in New York City. Skitch returned to London with his bride, and the couple had two sons, Robert and Phillip, respectively a schoolmaster and a hotel manager.

During his years with D'Oyly Carte, Skitch studied law. After leaving the company, he obtained a BSc in Biological Science from London University and subsequently became a teacher, working at Oakham School in Rutland before moving on to Malvern College as head of the Biology Department. In 1981 he became the Principal of Elmhurst Ballet School, with his wife as vice-principal. His ex-D'Oyly Carte colleagues found this amusing, as they considered that dancing had not been his strong suit. They bought a weekend home in Lymington in Hampshire, where they enjoyed sailing their yacht Pinafore. On his retirement in 1995, Skitch and his wife moved to Lymington, where he served as a director of a property management company called "South Grove Maintenance (Lymington) Limited".

Skitch died in Southampton at age 85.
