= Hugh Talbot =

Irish tenor (1844–1899)

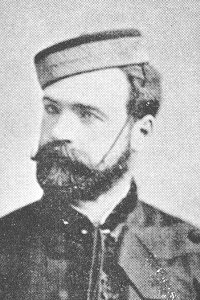
Hugh Talbot as Frederic in The Pirates of Penzance

Hugh Talbot (15 October 1844 – 31 October 1899), born Hugo Talbot Brennan, was an Irish tenor best known for creating, to universally bad reviews, the role of Frederic in the Gilbert and Sullivan hit The Pirates of Penzance in the original New York production.

After beginning his career in Italy in 1872, Talbot performed Italian opera in England in 1877–1878 with Mapleson's Italian Opera company. He was then engaged by Richard D'Oyly Carte in 1879 to originate the role of Frederic. After his critical disaster in the role, Talbot toured unsuccessfully with several American opera companies, settling in California in 1881, where he became a successful voice teacher.

== Life and career ==
=== Early life and career ===
Born at Portobello Barracks near Dublin to Edward Brennan and his wife Margaret, Talbot was the fifth of six siblings. He and his family moved to London by 1851, where he was reportedly a choirboy as a youth and later clerked for a lawyer. An amateur tenor by 1868, Talbot sang with such groups as the Moray Minstrels. By 1872, Talbot travelled to Italy to study music, where he began to perform under the name Signor Ugo Talbo in 1872, appearing in Giuseppe Verdi's Rigoletto, as the title character in Faust and as Alvaro in La Forza del destino, among other roles, and in concerts until at about 1876.

He returned to Britain in 1877 and became a principal tenor at Her Majesty's Theatre with Mapleson's Italian Opera company. Still performing as Ugo Talbo, he first sang the Duke in Rigoletto. While The Times review praised him generally, it commented that he still had much to learn. The Era, however, called him "a new tenor of considerable merit. ... He has an excellent voice, of good compass, and sympathetic in quality. It is brilliant and effective especially in the upper portion. ... Signor Talbo has, besides, a good stage presence and his acting is characterised by earnestness." He also played the title role in Faust opposite Christina Nilsson. By the end of the season, The Musical Times stated that Talbot "has gradually worn out the welcome accorded to him on his debut". In August that year, he embarked on a two month long concert tour in Scandinavia. After Christmas, Talbot rejoined the Mapleson company as Fabrizio in L'Ombre by Friedrich von Flotow, earning another warm review from The Era. He subsequently toured in 1878 with Mapleson as Carlo in Linda di Chamonix, but afterwards he was seen only in a few concerts with the company and in a few concerts elsewhere.

=== D'Oyly Carte experience ===
In the autumn of 1879, Richard D'Oyly Carte sent one of his theatrical companies to play the first authorized production H.M.S. Pinafore in America, and the company also prepared for the opening of the next Gilbert and Sullivan opera, The Pirates of Penzance, for its première in New York. Pinafore opened at the Fifth Avenue Theatre in New York City on 1 December 1879, and Talbot was cast in the leading tenor role of Ralph Rackstraw. The opening night review of Pinafore in The New York Times commented, "The Ralph Rackstraw, Mr. Hugh Talbot, has a light, pleasant tenor voice, which was not thoroughly under his control last evening, and he is also the best actor who has appeared here in the character".

On 31 December 1879, he created the role of Frederic in The Pirates of Penzance. Talbot's Frederic was perhaps the most roundly criticized performance of any Gilbert and Sullivan opera's opening night. Nearly every critic eviscerated him in reviews. The New York Times reviewer wrote:

The essential part of the young pirate apprentice received inadequate attention from the tenor. His make-up resulted in his appearing, in the first act, to be of advanced age; he was not, apparently, acquainted with his lines, and his singing was weak and tame. But the others were so spirited and generally enthusiastic that the effect of the opera was not materially injured by this weak spot in the cast.

The World was not much kinder: "Mr. Talbot sang some of the airs allotted to the tenor admirably, but he was utterly innocent of any appreciation whatever of the humor of the situations and shamefully ignorant of his lines." The Herald added: "The members of the company were not all perfect in their parts, Mr. Talbot seriously interfering with the full effect of some good points by groping after his cue in a most vague manner." Unkindest of all was The Sun, whose critic said: "Mr. Talbot, the tenor, had unfortunately apparently not thought it necessary to commit his lines, and made nonsense of much of his role, reflecting no credit upon himself, and nearly bringing the play at times into confusion".

Similar sentiments were reflected in the Mirror, the Tribune, and The Hour. Sullivan, for his part, was equally displeased, writing to his mother on 2 January 1880: "Our Company and all the Chorus are charming people and devoted to us, and spared themselves no pains or trouble to do their work thoroughly well. All except the Tenor, who is an idiot – vain and empty-headed. He very nearly upset the piece on the first night as he didn't know his words, and forgot his music. We shall, I think, have to get rid of him". Talbot remained with the company in New York until 6 March 1880, when he left the company following an argument with Gilbert. In the interim, he had briefly travelled to Philadelphia to play Frederic for the opening of Carte's Second American Company. He apparently played at some additional performances in March and April in Boston and New York.

W. S. Gilbert scholar Andrew Crowther noted, "The Sorcerer, H.M.S. Pinafore and The Pirates of Penzance are bound together by their tenor heroes. But Gilbert had problems with his tenors – George Bentham ... and Hugh Talbot. ... It is not surprising, therefore, to see that in the next two operas [Patience and Iolanthe] the tenor roles are much smaller and less significant".

=== After D'Oyly Carte ===
After leaving D'Oyly Carte, Talbot appeared on tour with Tagliapietra's Opera Company in the US in such operas as Il Trovatore, Faust and Martha. He next joined the Blanche Roosevelt English Opera Company as Epitmethius in an unsuccessful production of B. C. Stephenson and Alfred Cellier's The Masque of Pandora in Boston in 1881. Again performing as Signor Ugo Talbo, he then joined an opera company, organized by Max Strakosch Clarence Hess, for a few weeks, in Faust and Mefistofele. After this, in August 1881, he moved to San Francisco, California, where he joined Inez Fabbri's opera company in Carmen and La Dame blanche, but the season was a failure. Nevertheless, Talbot lived for the rest of his life in California, singing in concerts and becoming a successful singing teacher.

Talbot died in Stockton, California, in 1899.
