= H.M.S. Parliament =

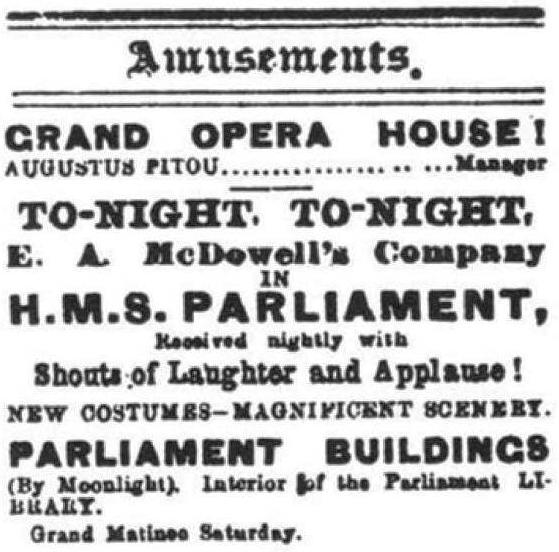
Advertisement published in the Toronto Globe, 11 May 1880

H.M.S. Parliament, also titled The Lady Who Loved A Government Clerk, is a comic operetta. Published in 1880, it adapted the music of H.M.S. Pinafore by Arthur Sullivan to a new libretto by William H. Fuller (who was also the librettist for The Unspecific Scandal). The work satirised contemporary Canadian politics, particularly the perceived corruption of Sir John A Macdonald and his government. It was written as a "piece of extravagance" for performance by the Eugene McDowell Comedy Company, an American-led touring group active from 1875 to 1890. The foreword suggested that the show existed only "for the fun of things" rather than any "political proclivities".

The characters are largely similar to those of HMS Pinafore: Captain Corcoran is rewritten as Captain McA (John A. Macdonald); Dick Deadeye becomes Alexander MacDeadeye (Alexander Mackenzie, Canada's second prime minister); Sir Joseph Porter is renamed Sir Samuel Sillery (Sir Samuel Leonard Tilley, finance minister); and the couple Josephine and Ralph are presented as Angelina and Sam Snifter. The new libretto too is loosely based on the original: for example, where Pinafore opens "We sail the ocean blue / and our saucy ship's a beauty", Parliament begins "We sail the ship of state / tho' our craft is rather leaky".

H.M.S. Parliament opened in Montreal at the Academy of Music on 16 February 1880. The work was positively received by initial audiences, and its planned run became a multi-city tour spanning 30 communities over five months. After that tour finished, political events had made the satire out-of-date, so no further performances were done. The piece re-emerged when its book and lyrics were included in a volume of Canada's Lost Plays in 1978; a few attempts at revival were made shortly afterwards, including at least two full productions. A director of one such revival noted that "Fuller's sparkling wit remains the main preserving spice...[which] spares the operetta from the worst excesses of Victorian sentiment and patriotism". TrypTych Concert and Opera presented HMS Parliament in October 2017 in Toronto. Christopher Hoile of Stage-Door.com wrote: "TrypTych Concert & Opera has given Toronto, and indeed Canada, a great present for Canada’s sesquicentennial by producing H.M.S. Parliament for the first time with orchestra since its premiere and tour in 1880."
