= H.M.S. Pinafore =

1878 comic opera by Gilbert & Sullivan

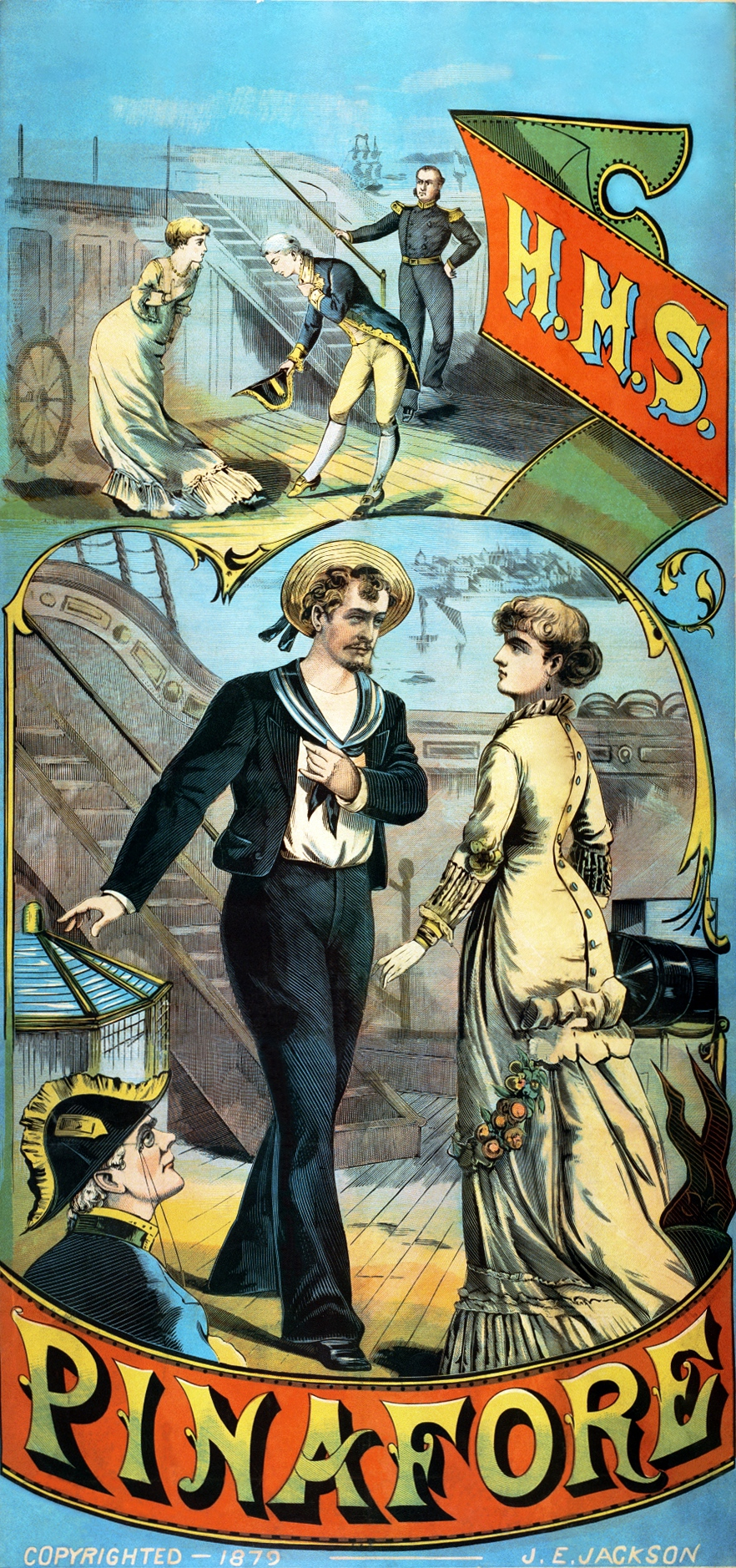
Theatre poster, 1879

H.M.S. Pinafore; or, The Lass That Loved a Sailor is a comic opera in two acts, with music by Arthur Sullivan and a libretto by W. S. Gilbert. It opened at the Opera Comique in London on 25 May 1878, and ran for 571 performances, which was the second-longest run of any musical theatre piece up to that time. H.M.S. Pinafore was Gilbert and Sullivan's fourth operatic collaboration and their first international sensation.

The story takes place aboard the Royal Navy ship HMS Pinafore. The captain's daughter, Josephine, is in love with a lower-class sailor, Ralph Rackstraw, although her father intends her to marry Sir Joseph Porter, the First Lord of the Admiralty. She abides by her father's wishes at first, but Sir Joseph's advocacy of the equality of humankind encourages Ralph and Josephine to overturn conventional social order. They declare their love for each other and eventually plan to elope. The Captain discovers this plan, but, as in many of the Gilbert and Sullivan operas, a surprise disclosure changes things dramatically near the end of the story.

Drawing on several of his earlier "Bab Ballad" poems, Gilbert imbued this plot with mirth and absurdity. The opera's humour focuses on love between members of different social classes and lampoons the British class system in general. Pinafore also pokes good-natured fun at patriotism, party politics, the Royal Navy, and the rise of unqualified people to positions of authority. The title of the piece comically applies the name of a garment for girls and women, a pinafore, to the fearsome symbol of a warship.

Pinafore's extraordinary popularity in Britain, America and elsewhere was followed by the similar success of a series of Gilbert and Sullivan works, including The Pirates of Penzance and The Mikado. Their works, later known as the Savoy operas, dominated the musical stage on both sides of the Atlantic for more than a decade and continue to be performed today. The structure and style of these operas, particularly Pinafore, were much copied and contributed significantly to the development of modern musical theatre.

== Background ==
In 1875, Richard D'Oyly Carte, who was then managing the Royalty Theatre for Selina Dolaro, brought Gilbert and Sullivan together to write their second show, a one-act opera entitled Trial by Jury. This proved a success, and in 1876 D'Oyly Carte assembled a group of financial backers to establish the Comedy Opera Company, which was devoted to the production and promotion of family-friendly English comic opera. With this theatre company, Carte finally had the financial resources, after many failed attempts, to produce a new full-length Gilbert and Sullivan opera. This next opera was The Sorcerer, which opened in November 1877. It too was successful, running for 178 performances. Sheet music from the show sold well, and street musicians played the melodies.

Instead of writing a piece for production by a theatre proprietor, as was usual in Victorian theatres, Gilbert, Sullivan and Carte produced the show with their own financial support. They were therefore able to choose their own cast of performers, rather than being obliged to use the actors already engaged at the theatre. They chose talented actors, most of whom were not well-known stars and did not command high fees, and to whom they could teach a more naturalistic style of performance than was commonly used at the time. They then tailored their work to the particular abilities of these performers. The skill with which Gilbert and Sullivan used their performers had an effect on the audience; as critic Herman Klein wrote: "we secretly marvelled at the naturalness and ease with which [the Gilbertian quips and absurdities] were said and done. For until then no living soul had seen upon the stage such weird, eccentric, yet intensely human beings. ... [They] conjured into existence a hitherto unknown comic world of sheer delight."

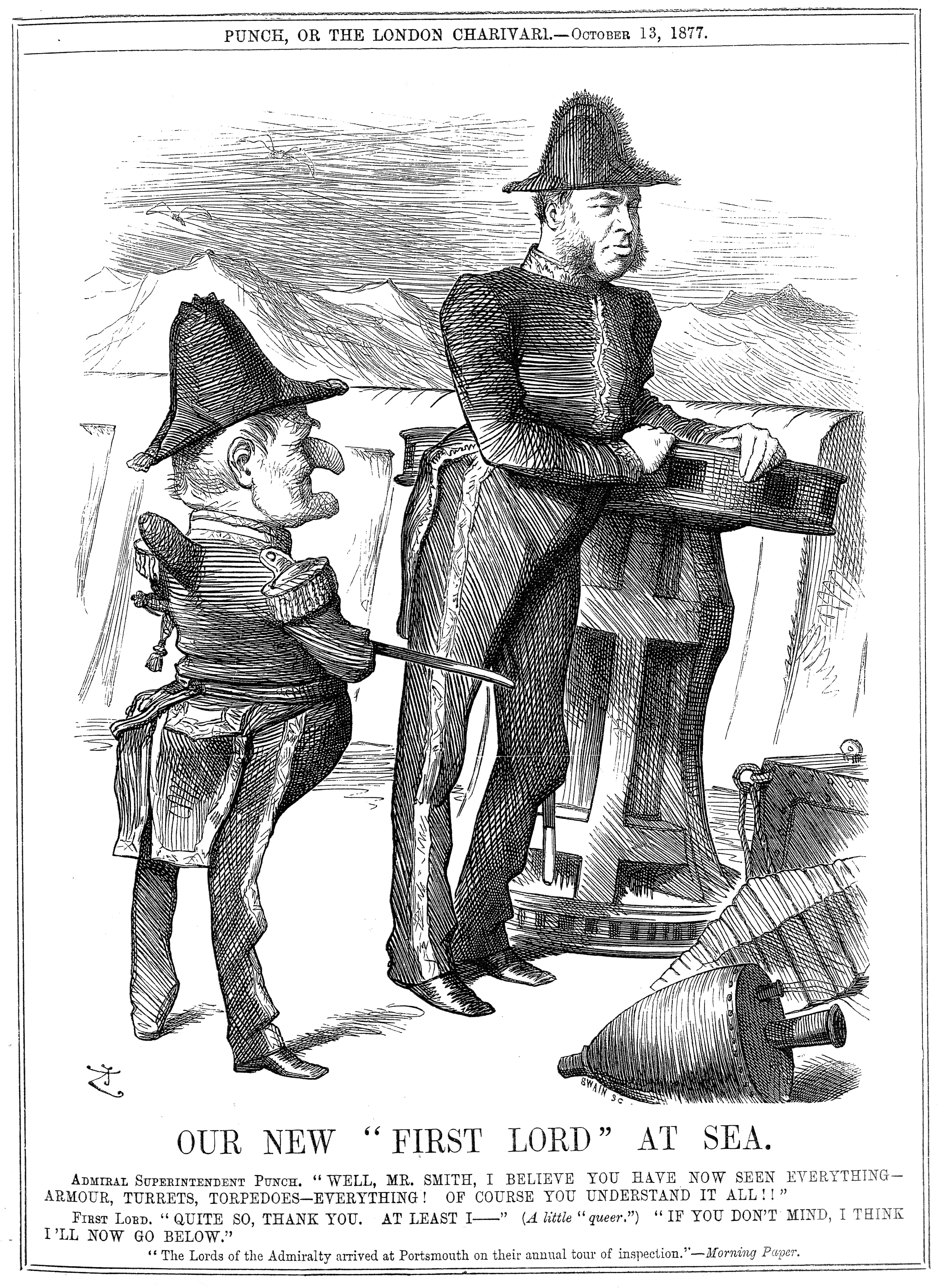
Punch cartoon, 1877, portraying First Lord of the Admiralty W. H. Smith as a land-lubber, saying: "I think I'll now go below." In Pinafore, Sir Joseph similarly sings: "When the breezes blow / I generally go below".

The success of The Sorcerer paved the way for another collaboration by Gilbert and Sullivan. Carte agreed on terms for a new opera with the Comedy Opera Company, and Gilbert began work on H.M.S. Pinafore before the end of 1877. Gilbert's father had been a naval surgeon, and the nautical theme of the opera appealed to him. He drew on several of his earlier "Bab Ballad" poems (many of which also have nautical themes), including "Captain Reece" (1868) and "General John" (1867). Some of the characters also have prototypes in the ballads: Dick Deadeye is based on a character in "Woman's Gratitude" (1869); an early version of Ralph Rackstraw can be seen in "Joe Go-Lightly" (1867), with its sailor madly in love with the daughter of someone who far outranks him; and Little Buttercup is taken almost wholesale from "The Bumboat Woman's Story" (1870). On 27 December 1877, while Sullivan was on holiday on the French Riviera, Gilbert sent him a plot sketch accompanied by the following note:

I have very little doubt whatever but that you will be pleased with it. ... there is a good deal of fun in it which I haven't set down on paper. Among other things a song (a kind of 'Judge's Song') for the First Lord – tracing his career as office-boy ... clerk, traveller, junior partner and First Lord of Britain's Navy. ... Of course there will be no personality in this – the fact that the First Lord in the Opera is a Radical of the most pronounced type will do away with any suspicion that W. H. Smith is intended.

Despite Gilbert's disclaimer, audiences, critics and even the Prime Minister, Benjamin Disraeli, identified Sir Joseph Porter with W. H. Smith, a politician who had recently been appointed First Lord of the Admiralty despite having neither military nor nautical experience. Sullivan was delighted with the sketch, and Gilbert read a first draft of the plot to Carte in mid-January.

Following the example of his mentor, T. W. Robertson, Gilbert strove to ensure that the costumes and sets were as realistic as possible. When preparing the sets for H.M.S. Pinafore, Gilbert and Sullivan visited Portsmouth in April 1878 to inspect ships. Gilbert made sketches of H.M.S. Victory and H.M.S. St Vincent and created a model set for the carpenters to work from. This was far from standard procedure in Victorian drama, in which naturalism was still a relatively new concept, and in which most authors had very little influence on how their plays and libretti were staged. This attention to detail was typical of Gilbert's stage management and would be repeated in all of his Savoy operas. Gilbert's focus on visual accuracy provided a "right-side-up for topsy-turvydom", that is, a realistic point of reference that serves to heighten the whimsicality and absurdity of the situations. Sullivan was "in the full swing" of work on the piece by the middle of April 1878. The bright and cheerful music of Pinafore was composed during a time when Sullivan suffered from excruciating pain from a kidney stone. The cast began music rehearsals on 24 April, and at the beginning of May 1878, the two collaborators worked closely together at Sullivan's flat to finalise the piece.

In Pinafore, Gilbert, Sullivan and Carte used several of the principal cast members whom they had assembled for The Sorcerer. As Gilbert had suggested to Sullivan in December 1877, "Mrs. Cripps [Little Buttercup] will be a capital part for Everard ... Barrington will be a capital captain, and Grossmith a first-rate First Lord." However, Mrs Howard Paul, (Note: Mrs Paul had left her husband around 1877, as he was having an affair with the actress-dancer Letty Lind, with whom he sired two children. However, she continued performing under this name.) who had played Lady Sangazure in The Sorcerer, was declining vocally. She was under contract to play the role of Cousin Hebe in Pinafore. Gilbert made an effort to write an amusing part for her despite Sullivan's reluctance to use her, but by mid-May 1878, both Gilbert and Sullivan wanted her out of the cast; unhappy with the role, she left. With only a week to go before opening night, Carte hired a concert singer, Jessie Bond, to play Cousin Hebe. Since Bond had little experience as an actress, Gilbert and Sullivan cut the dialogue out of the role, except for a few lines in the last scene, which they turned into recitative. (Note: The dialogue that was cut was based on lines from Gilbert's 1877 farce On Bail; it would be revised again and used as part of Patience in 1881.) Other new cast members were Emma Howson and George Power in the romantic roles, who were improvements on the romantic soprano and tenor in The Sorcerer.

Gilbert acted as stage director for his own plays and operas. He sought realism in acting, just as he strove for realistic visual elements. He deprecated self-conscious interaction with the audience and insisted on a style of portrayal in which the characters were never aware of their own absurdity but were coherent internal wholes. Sullivan conducted the music rehearsals. As was to be his usual practice in his later operas, Sullivan left the overture for the last moment, sketching it out and entrusting it to the company's music director, in this case Alfred Cellier, to complete. Pinafore opened on 25 May 1878 at the Opera Comique.

== Roles ==
- The Rt. Hon. Sir Joseph Porter, KCB, First Lord of the Admiralty (comic baritone)
- Captain Corcoran, Commander of H.M.S. Pinafore (lyric baritone)
- Ralph (Note: The traditional British pronunciation of this name is "rafe" (/reɪf/). Gilbert rhymes it with "waif" in the lyrics of Little Buttercup's Act II song, "A many years ago".) Rackstraw, Able Seaman (tenor)
- Dick Deadeye, Able Seaman (bass-baritone)
- Bill Bobstay, Boatswain's Mate (baritone)
- Bob Becket, Carpenter's Mate (bass)
- Josephine, The Captain's Daughter (soprano)
- Cousin Hebe, Sir Joseph's First Cousin (mezzo-soprano)
- Mrs. Cripps (Little Buttercup), A Portsmouth Bumboat Woman (contralto)
- Chorus of First Lord's Sisters, His Cousins, His Aunts, Sailors, Marines, etc.

== Synopsis ==
=== Act I ===
The British warship H.M.S. Pinafore is at anchor off Portsmouth. The sailors are on the quarterdeck, proudly "cleaning brasswork, splicing rope, etc."

Little Buttercup, a Portsmouth "bumboat woman" (dockside vendor) – who is the rosiest, roundest, and "reddest beauty in all Spithead" – comes on board to sell her wares to the crew. She hints that she may be hiding a dark secret under her "gay and frivolous exterior". Ralph Rackstraw, "the smartest lad in all the fleet", enters, declaring his love for the Captain's daughter, Josephine. His fellow sailors (excepting Dick Deadeye, the grim and ugly realist of the crew) offer their sympathies, but they can give Ralph little hope that his love will ever be returned.

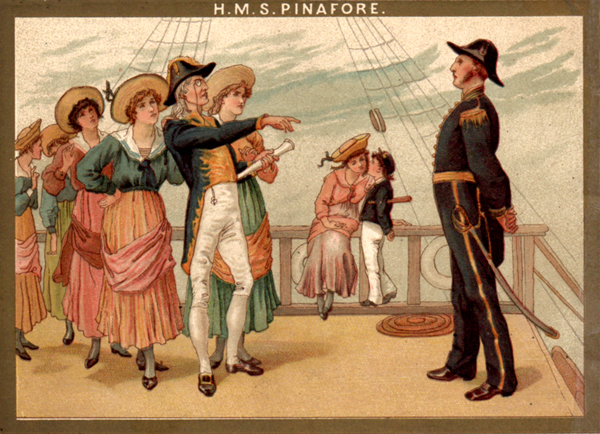
Scene from 1886 Savoy Theatre souvenir programme

The gentlemanly and popular Captain Corcoran greets his "gallant crew" and compliments them on their politeness, saying that he returns the favour by never ("well, hardly ever") using bad language, such as "a big, big D". (Note: "Big D" meant "damn". See Bradley (1996), p. 128. In Act II, the Captain does use a big D, which shocks Sir Joseph and his female relatives.) After the sailors leave, the Captain confesses to Little Buttercup that Josephine is reluctant to consider a marriage proposal from Sir Joseph Porter, the First Lord of the Admiralty. Buttercup says that she knows how it feels to love in vain. As she leaves, the Captain remarks that she is "a plump and pleasing person". Josephine enters and reveals to her father that she loves a humble sailor in his crew, but she assures him that she is a dutiful daughter and will never reveal her love to this sailor.

Sir Joseph comes on board, accompanied by his "admiring crowd of sisters, cousins, and aunts". He recounts how he rose from humble beginnings to be "ruler of the Queen's Navee" through persistence, although he has no naval qualifications. He then delivers a humiliating lesson in etiquette, telling the Captain that he must always say "if you please" after giving an order; for "A British sailor is any man's equal" – excepting Sir Joseph's. Sir Joseph has composed a song to illustrate that point, and he gives a copy of it to Ralph. Shortly afterwards, elated by Sir Joseph's views on equality, Ralph decides that he will declare his love to Josephine. This delights his shipmates, except Dick Deadeye, who contends that "when people have to obey other people's orders, equality's out of the question". Shocked by his words, the other sailors force Dick to listen to Sir Joseph's song before they exit, leaving Ralph alone on deck. Josephine now enters, and Ralph confesses his love in terms surprisingly eloquent for a "common sailor". Josephine is touched, but although she has found Sir Joseph's attentions nauseating, she knows that it is her duty to marry Sir Joseph instead of Ralph. Disguising her true feelings, she "haughtily rejects" Ralph's "proffered love".

Ralph summons his shipmates (Sir Joseph's female relatives also arrive) and tells them that he is bent on suicide. The crew expresses sympathy, except for Dick, who provides a stark counterpoint of dissent. Ralph puts a pistol to his head, but as he is about to pull the trigger, Josephine enters, admitting that she loves him after all. Ralph and Josephine plan to sneak ashore to elope that night. Dick Deadeye warns them to "forbear, nor carry out the scheme", but the joyous ship's company ignores him.

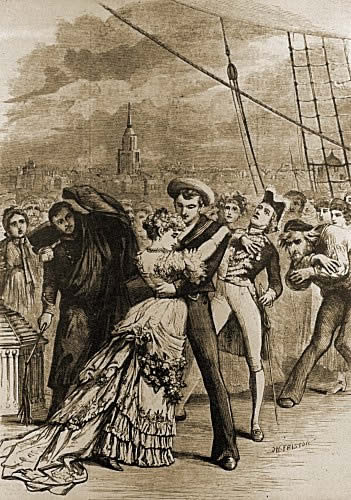
Illustration of the characters in Act II by D. H. Friston, 1878

=== Act II ===
Later that night, under a full moon, Captain Corcoran reviews his concerns: his "kindly crew rebels", his "daughter to a tar is partial", his friends seem to desert him, and Sir Joseph has threatened a court-martial. Little Buttercup offers sympathy. He tells her that, if it were not for the difference in their social standing, he would have returned her affection. She prophesies that things are not all as they seem and that "a change" is in store for him, but he does not understand her cryptic warning.

Sir Joseph enters and complains that Josephine has not yet agreed to marry him. The Captain speculates that she is probably dazzled by his "exalted rank" and that if Sir Joseph can persuade her that "love levels all ranks", she will accept his proposal. They withdraw, and Josephine enters, still feeling guilty about her planned elopement with Ralph and fearful of giving up a life of luxury. When Sir Joseph makes the argument that "love levels all ranks", a delighted Josephine says that she "will hesitate no longer". The Captain and Sir Joseph rejoice, but Josephine is now more determined than ever to marry Ralph.

Dick Deadeye intercepts the Captain and tells him of the lovers' plans to elope. The Captain confronts Ralph and Josephine as they try to leave the ship. The pair declare their love, justifying their actions because "He is an Englishman!" The furious Captain is unmoved and blurts out, "Why, damme, it's too bad!" Sir Joseph and his relatives, who have overheard this oath, are shocked to hear swearing on board a ship, and Sir Joseph orders the Captain confined to his cabin.

When Sir Joseph asks what had provoked the usually polite officer's outburst, Ralph replies that it was his declaration of love for Josephine. Furious in his turn at this revelation, and ignoring Josephine's plea to spare Ralph, Sir Joseph has the sailor "loaded with chains" and taken to the ship's brig. Little Buttercup now comes forward to reveal her long-held secret. Many years ago, when she "practised baby-farming", she had cared for two babies, one "of low condition", the other "a regular patrician". She confesses that she "mixed those children up. ... The wellborn babe was Ralph; your Captain was the other."

Sir Joseph now realises that Ralph should have been the Captain, and the Captain should have been Ralph. He summons both, and they emerge wearing each other's uniforms: Ralph as captain, in command of the Pinafore, and Corcoran as a common sailor. Sir Joseph's marriage with Josephine is now "out of the question" in his eyes: "love levels all ranks ... to a considerable extent, but it does not level them as much as that." He hands her to Captain Rackstraw. The former Captain's now-humble social rank leaves him free to marry Buttercup. Sir Joseph settles for his cousin Hebe, and all ends in general rejoicing.

== Musical numbers ==
Excerpts from the 1907 Odeon recording of the opera
Hail! men-o'-war's men ... I'm called Little Buttercup

Now give three cheers ... I am the Monarch of the Sea ... When I was a lad

Never mind the why and wherefore

- Overture

Act I

- 1. "We sail the ocean blue" (Sailors)
- 2. "Hail! men-o'-war's men" ... "I'm called Little Buttercup" (Buttercup)
- 2a. "But tell me who's the youth" (Buttercup and Boatswain)
- 3. "The nightingale" (Ralph and Chorus of Sailors)
- 3a. "A maiden fair to see" (Ralph and Chorus of Sailors)
- 4. "My gallant crew, good morning ... I am the Captain of the Pinafore" (Captain and Chorus of Sailors)
- 4a. "Sir, you are sad" (Buttercup and Captain)
- 5. "Sorry her lot who loves too well" (Josephine)
- 5a. Cut song: "Reflect, my child" (Captain and Josephine)
- 6. "Over the bright blue sea" (Chorus of Female Relatives)
- 7. "Sir Joseph's barge is seen" (Chorus of Sailors and Female Relatives)
- 8. "Now give three cheers ... I am the Monarch of the sea" (Captain, Sir Joseph, Cousin Hebe and Chorus)
- 9. "When I was a lad" (Sir Joseph and Chorus)
- 9a. "For I hold that on the sea" (Sir Joseph, Cousin Hebe and Chorus)
- 10. "A British tar" (Ralph, Boatswain, Carpenter's Mate and Chorus of Sailors)
- 11. "Refrain, audacious tar" (Josephine and Ralph)
- 12. Finale, Act I (Ensemble)
  - "Can I survive this overbearing?"
  - "Oh joy, oh rapture unforeseen"
  - "Let's give three cheers for the sailor's bride"
  - "A British tar" (reprise)

Act II

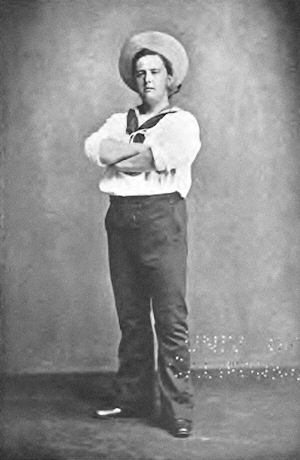
Rutland Barrington as A.B.S. Corcoran at the end of Pinafore

(Entr'acte)

- 13. "Fair moon, to thee I sing" (Captain)
- 14. "Things are seldom what they seem" (Buttercup and Captain)
- 15. "The hours creep on apace" (Josephine)
- 16. "Never mind the why and wherefore" (Josephine, Captain and Sir Joseph)
- 17. "Kind Captain, I've important information" (Captain and Dick Deadeye)
- 18. "Carefully on tiptoe stealing" (Soli and Chorus)
- 18a. "Pretty daughter of mine" (Captain and Ensemble) and "He is an Englishman" (Boatswain and Ensemble)
- 19. "Farewell, my own" (Ralph, Josephine, Sir Joseph, Buttercup and Chorus)
- 20. "A many years ago" (Buttercup and Chorus)
- 20a. "Here, take her, sir" (Sir Joseph, Josephine, Ralph, Cousin Hebe and Chorus) (Note: See discussion of versions, below.)
- 21. Finale: "Oh joy, oh rapture unforeseen" (Ensemble) (Note: Includes reprises of several songs, concluding with "For he is an Englishman".)

== Productions ==
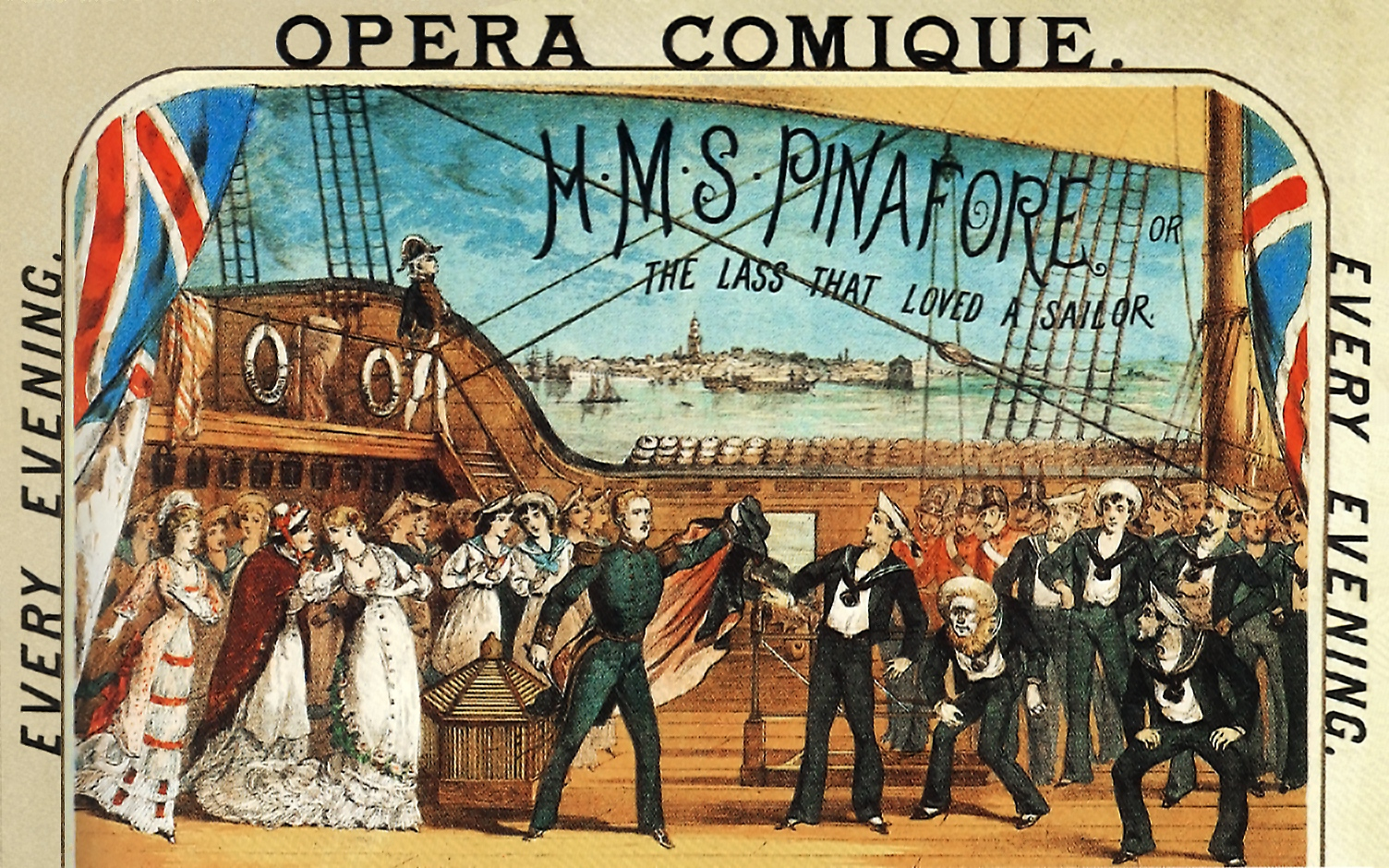
Poster illustration from original 1878 production

Pinafore opened on 25 May 1878 at the Opera Comique, before an enthusiastic audience, with Sullivan conducting. (Note: After opening night, the company's musical director, Alfred Cellier, conducted most of the performances. Eugène Goossens conducted the piece in late July and August 1878, while Cellier was assisting Sullivan at the promenade concerts at Covent Garden.) Soon, however, the piece suffered from weak ticket sales, generally ascribed to a heat wave that made the Opera Comique particularly uncomfortable. The historian Michael Ainger questions this explanation, at least in part, stating that the heat waves in the summer of 1878 were short and transient. By mid-August, Sullivan wrote to his mother that cooler weather had arrived, which was good for the show. In the meantime, the four partners of the Comedy Opera Company lost confidence in the opera's viability and posted closing notices. Carte publicised the piece by presenting a matinee concert performance on 6 July 1878 at the enormous Crystal Palace.

In late August 1878, Sullivan used some of the Pinafore music, arranged by his assistant Hamilton Clarke, during several successful promenade concerts at Covent Garden that generated interest and stimulated ticket sales. By September, Pinafore was playing to full houses at the Opera Comique. The piano score sold 10,000 copies, and Carte soon sent two additional companies out to tour in the provinces.

Carte, Gilbert and Sullivan now had the financial resources to produce shows themselves, without outside backers. Carte persuaded the author and composer that a business partnership among the three would be to their advantage, and they hatched a plan to separate themselves from the directors of the Comedy Opera Company. The contract between Gilbert and Sullivan and the Comedy Opera Company gave the latter the right to present Pinafore for the duration of the initial run. The Opera Comique was obliged to close for drain and sewer repairs, and it was renovated by E. W. Bradwell, from Christmas 1878 to the end of January 1879. Gilbert, Sullivan and Carte believed that this break ended the initial run, and, therefore, ended the company's rights. Carte put the matter beyond doubt by taking a six-month personal lease of the theatre beginning on 1 February 1879, the date of its re-opening, when Pinafore resumed. At the end of the six months, Carte planned to give notice to the Comedy Opera Company that its rights in the show and the theatre had ended.

Meanwhile, numerous versions of Pinafore, unauthorised by its creators, began playing in America with great success, beginning with a production in Boston that opened on 25 November 1878. Pinafore became a source of popular quotations on both sides of the Atlantic, such as the exchange:

"What, never?"
"No, never!"
"What, never?"
"Well, hardly ever!"

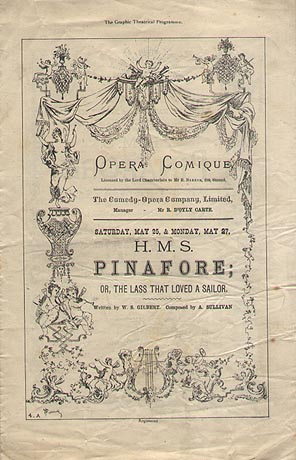
Opening night programme cover

In February 1879, Pinafore resumed operations at the Opera Comique. The opera also resumed touring in April, with two companies crisscrossing the British provinces by June, one starring Richard Mansfield as Sir Joseph, the other W. S. Penley in the role. Hoping to join in on the profits to be made in America from Pinafore, Carte left in June for New York to make arrangements for an "authentic" production there to be rehearsed personally by the author and composer. He arranged to rent a theatre and auditioned chorus members for the American production of Pinafore and a new Gilbert and Sullivan opera to be premiered in New York, and for tours.

Sullivan, as had been arranged with Carte and Gilbert, gave notice to the partners of the Comedy Opera Company in early July 1879 that he, Gilbert and Carte would not be renewing the contract to produce Pinafore with them and that he would be withdrawing his music from the Comedy Opera Company on 31 July. In return, the Comedy Opera Company gave notice that they intended to play Pinafore at another theatre and brought a legal action against Carte and company. They offered the London and touring casts of Pinafore more money to play in their production, and although some choristers accepted their offer, only one principal player, Aeneas Joseph Dymott, accepted. They engaged the Imperial Theatre but had no scenery. On 31 July, they sent a group of thugs to seize the scenery and props during Act II of the evening performance at the Opera Comique. Gilbert was away, and Sullivan was recovering from an operation for kidney stones. Stagehands and cast members managed to ward off their backstage attackers and protect the scenery, although the stage manager, Richard Barker, and others, were injured. The cast went on with the show until someone shouted "Fire!" George Grossmith, playing Sir Joseph, went before the curtain to calm the panicked audience. The police arrived to restore order, and the show continued. Gilbert sued to stop the Comedy Opera Company from staging their rival production of H.M.S. Pinafore. The court permitted the production to go on at the Imperial, beginning on 1 August 1879, and it transferred to the Olympic Theatre in September. Pauline Rita was one of a series of Josephines. The production received good notices and initially sold well but was withdrawn in October after 91 performances. The matter was eventually settled in court, where a judge ruled in Carte's favour about two years later.

After his return to London, Carte formed a new partnership with Gilbert and Sullivan to divide profits equally after the expenses of each of their shows. Meanwhile, Pinafore continued to play strongly. On 20 February 1880, Pinafore completed its initial run of 571 performances. Only one other work of musical theatre in the world had ever run longer, Robert Planquette's operetta Les cloches de Corneville.

=== Taking Pinafore to the United States ===
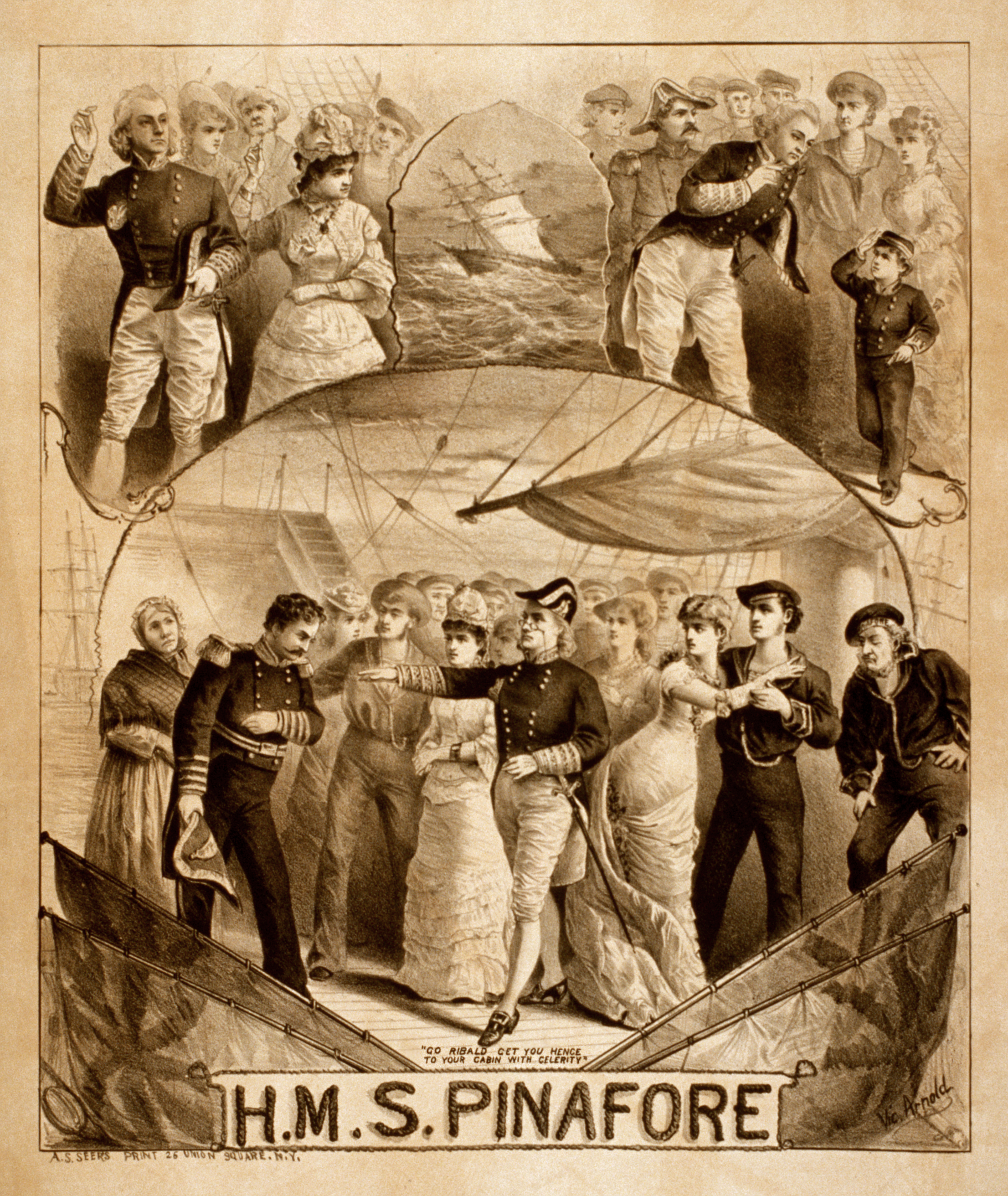
Advertisement for a (probably unlicensed) American production of H.M.S. Pinafore

Approximately 150 unauthorised productions of Pinafore sprang up in the United States in 1878 and 1879, and none of these paid royalties to the authors. Gilbert and Sullivan called them "pirated", although the creators did not have any international copyright protection. The first of these productions, opening at the Boston Museum on 25 November 1878, made such a splash that the piece was quickly produced in major cities and on tour by dozens of companies throughout the country. Boston alone saw at least a dozen productions, including a juvenile version described by Louisa May Alcott in her 1879 story, "Jimmy's Cruise in the Pinafore". In New York, different productions of the piece played simultaneously in eight theatres within five blocks of each other and in six theatres in Philadelphia. A production by Gorman's Philadelphia Church Choir Company, orchestrated by John Philip Sousa and starring Louis De Lange as Sir Joseph, played on Broadway and toured in the U.S. throughout 1879; Sousa's orchestration was also used in Australasia. The first production of Pinafore in Canada was at the Royal Opera House in Toronto, in February 1879, produced by the Holman Opera Company.

These unauthorised performances took many forms, including burlesques, productions with men playing women's roles and vice versa, spoofs, variety acts, Minstrel show versions, all-black and Catholic productions, German, Yiddish and other foreign-language versions, performances on boats or by church choirs, and productions starring casts of children. Few purported to play the opera as written. (Note: James C. Duff claimed falsely that his "faithful" January 1879 production in New York used performing materials that he had personally secured from the author and composer.) Sheet music arrangements were popular, there were Pinafore-themed dolls and household items, and references to the opera were common in advertising, news and other media. Gilbert, Sullivan and Carte brought lawsuits in the U.S. and tried for many years to control the American performance copyrights over their operas, or at least to claim some royalties, without success. They made a special effort to claim American rights for their next work after Pinafore, The Pirates of Penzance, by giving the official premiere in New York.

Gilbert, Sullivan and Carte met by 24 April 1879 to make plans for a production of Pinafore in America. Carte travelled to New York in the summer of 1879 and made arrangements with theatre manager John T. Ford (Note: Ford had been one of the few managers who had paid Gilbert and Sullivan any kind of fee for performing Pinafore in America, and his reward for a small gesture was great.) to present, at the Fifth Avenue Theatre, the first authorised American production of Pinafore. In November, Carte returned to America with Gilbert, Sullivan and a company of strong singers, including J. H. Ryley as Sir Joseph, Blanche Roosevelt as Josephine, Alice Barnett as Little Buttercup, Furneaux Cook as Dick Deadeye, Hugh Talbot as Ralph Rackstraw and Jessie Bond as Cousin Hebe. To these, he added some American singers, including Signor Brocolini as Captain Corcoran. Alfred Cellier came to assist Sullivan, while his brother François remained in London to conduct Pinafore there.

Pinafore opened in New York on 1 December 1879 (with Gilbert onstage in the chorus) and ran for the rest of December. After a reasonably strong first week, audiences quickly fell off, since most New Yorkers had already seen local productions of Pinafore. In the meantime, Gilbert and Sullivan raced to complete and rehearse their new opera, The Pirates of Penzance, which premiered with much success on 31 December. Shortly thereafter, Carte sent three touring companies around the United States East Coast and Midwest, playing Pinafore alongside Pirates.

=== Children's production ===
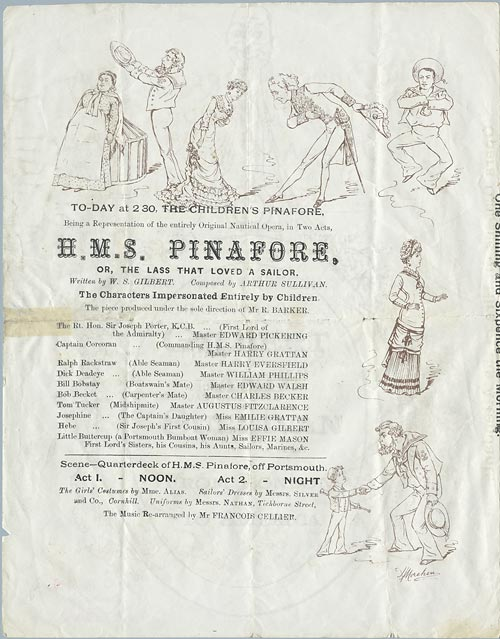
1880 programme for Carte's Children's Pinafore

The unauthorised juvenile productions of Pinafore were so popular that Carte mounted his own children's version, played at matinees at the Opera Comique beginning on 16 December 1879. François Cellier, who had taken over from his brother as Carte's music director in London, adapted the score for children's voices. Between its two Christmas seasons in London, the children's production went on a provincial tour from 2 August 1880 to 11 December 1880.

Carte's children's production earned enthusiastic reviews from the critic Clement Scott and the other London critics, as well as the audiences, including children. However, Captain Corcoran's curse "Damme!" was uncensored, shocking such prominent audience members as Lewis Carroll, (Note: Carroll had unsuccessfully sought to collaborate with Sullivan on an adaptation of Alice in Wonderland. This was not the first time that he had written a review expressing outraged indignation against Gilbert and Sullivan. He had objected to their treatment of the clergy in The Sorcerer.) who later wrote: "a bevy of sweet innocent-looking girls sing, with bright and happy looks, the chorus 'He said, Damn me! He said, Damn me!' I cannot find words to convey to the reader the pain I felt in seeing those dear children taught to utter such words to amuse ears grown callous to their ghastly meaning ... How Mr. Gilbert could have stooped to write, or Sir Arthur Sullivan could have prostituted his noble art to set to music, such vile trash, it passes my skill to understand".

=== Subsequent productions ===
After the opera became successful in London, Richard D'Oyly Carte quickly sent touring companies into the British provinces. At least one D'Oyly Carte company, and sometimes as many as three, played Pinafore under Carte's aegis every year between 1878 and 1888, including its first London revival in 1887. The opera was then given a rest, returning to the touring repertory between 1894 and 1900 and again for most of the time between 1903 and 1940. Gilbert directed all the revivals during his lifetime, and after his death, the D'Oyly Carte Opera Company had exclusive performing rights to the Savoy operas until 1962. It continued to hew closely to Gilbert's directions throughout that period, as recorded in Gilbert's prompt books, and it also required its licensees to follow them closely.

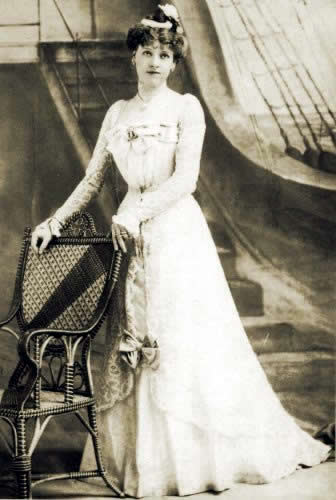
Ruth Vincent as Josephine in 1899

Until 1908, revivals of the opera were given in contemporary dress, with ladies' costumes executed by couture houses such as Redfern. After that, designers such as Percy Anderson, George Sheringham and Peter Goffin created Victorian costume designs. The 1887 set was designed by Hawes Craven. In the winter of 1940–41, the D'Oyly Carte Opera Company's scenery and costumes for Pinafore and three other operas were destroyed by German bombs during World War II. The opera was revived in London in the summer of 1947. It was then included in the D'Oyly Carte repertory in every season from then on, until the company's closure in 1982. The D'Oyly Carte company performed Pinafore before Queen Elizabeth II and the royal family at Windsor Castle on 16 June 1977, during the queen's Silver Jubilee year, the first royal command performance of a Gilbert and Sullivan opera since 1891.

The D'Oyly Carte Opera Company did not allow any other professional company to present the Savoy operas in Britain and the Commonwealth until the copyrights expired at the end of 1961, although it licensed many amateur and school societies to do so, beginning in the 19th century. Other professional productions since the copyrights expired have included Tyrone Guthrie's 1960 production from Stratford, Ontario, seen on Broadway in 1960 and in London in 1962 and a New Sadler's Wells Opera Company production first seen on 4 June 1984 at Sadler's Wells Theatre, which was seen also in New York. Scottish Opera, Welsh National Opera and many of the other British opera companies have mounted productions, as did the reconstituted D'Oyly Carte Opera Company between 1990 and its closure in 2003. In recent decades, the Carl Rosa Opera Company has produced Pinafore several times, including in 2009, Opera della Luna has toured it repeatedly, English National Opera presented it in 2021, it is regularly given by the National Gilbert & Sullivan Opera Company, and other British companies continue to mount the piece.

The extraordinary initial success of Pinafore in America was seen first-hand by J. C. Williamson. He soon made arrangements with D'Oyly Carte to present the opera's first authorised production in Australia, opening on 15 November 1879 at the Theatre Royal, Sydney. Thereafter, his opera company played frequent seasons of the work (and the subsequent Savoy operas) until at least 1963. In the U.S., the piece never lost popularity. The Internet Broadway Database links to a non-exhaustive list of 29 productions on Broadway alone. Among the professional repertory companies continuing to present Pinafore regularly in the U.S. are Opera a la Carte, based in California, Ohio Light Opera and the New York Gilbert and Sullivan Players, which tours the opera annually and often includes it in its New York seasons. Pinafore is still performed around the world by opera companies such as the Royal Theatre, Copenhagen; Australian Opera (and Essgee Entertainment and others in Australia); in Kassel, Germany; and even Samarkand, Uzbekistan.

The following table shows the history of the D'Oyly Carte productions (excluding tours) in Gilbert's lifetime:

Theatre	Opening date	Closing date	Perfs.	Details
Opera Comique	25 May 1878	24 December 1878	571	Original run in London. (The theatre was closed between 25 December 1878 and 31 January 1879.)
Opera Comique	31 January 1879	20 February 1880	571	Original run in London. (The theatre was closed between 25 December 1878 and 31 January 1879.)
Fifth Avenue Theatre, New York	1 December 1879	27 December 1879	28	Official American premiere in New York, prior to the opening of The Pirates of Penzance.
Opera Comique	16 December 1879	20 March 1880	78	Company of juvenile performers, matinees only. (This company went on a provincial tour from 2 August to 11 December 1880.)
Opera Comique	22 December 1880	28 January 1881	28	Company of juvenile performers, matinees only. (This company went on a provincial tour from 2 August to 11 December 1880.)
Savoy Theatre	12 November 1887	10 March 1888	120	First London revival.
Savoy Theatre	6 June 1899	25 November 1899	174	Second London revival. Played with Trial by Jury as a forepiece.
Savoy Theatre	14 July 1908	27 March 1909	61	Second Savoy repertory season; played with five other operas. (Closing date shown is of the entire season.)

== Reception ==
=== Initial critical reception ===
The early reviews were mostly favourable. The Era wrote:

Seldom indeed have we been in the company of a more joyous audience. ... [Gilbert and Sullivan] have on previous occasions been productive of such legitimate amusement, such novel forms of drollery, such original wit, and unexpected whimsicality, that nothing was more natural than for the audience to anticipate an evening of thorough enjoyment. The expectation was fulfilled completely. Those who believed in the power of Mr Gilbert to tickle the fancy with quaint suggestions and unexpected forms of humour were more than satisfied, and those who appreciate Mr Arthur Sullivan's inexhaustible gift of melody were equally gratified; while that large class of playgoers who are pleased with brilliant dresses and charming stage effects declared themselves delighted. The result, therefore, was "a hit, a palpable hit" ... there were some slight drawbacks [such] as the severe cold that affected Mr. Rutland Barrington [the captain], and almost prevented his singing.

The Era also lavishly praised Emma Howson as Josephine. The Entr'acte and Limelight commented that the opera was reminiscent of Trial by Jury and Sorcerer but found it diverting and called the music "very charming. To hear so-called grand opera imitated through the medium of the most trifling lyrics, is funny". The paper praised Grossmith as Sir Joseph, noting with amusement that he was made up to look like portraits of Horatio Nelson, "and his good introductory song seems levelled at" W. H. Smith. It opined, further, that "He Is an Englishman" is "an excellent satire on the proposition that a man must necessarily be virtuous to be English". It found the piece, as a whole, well presented and predicted that it would have a long run.

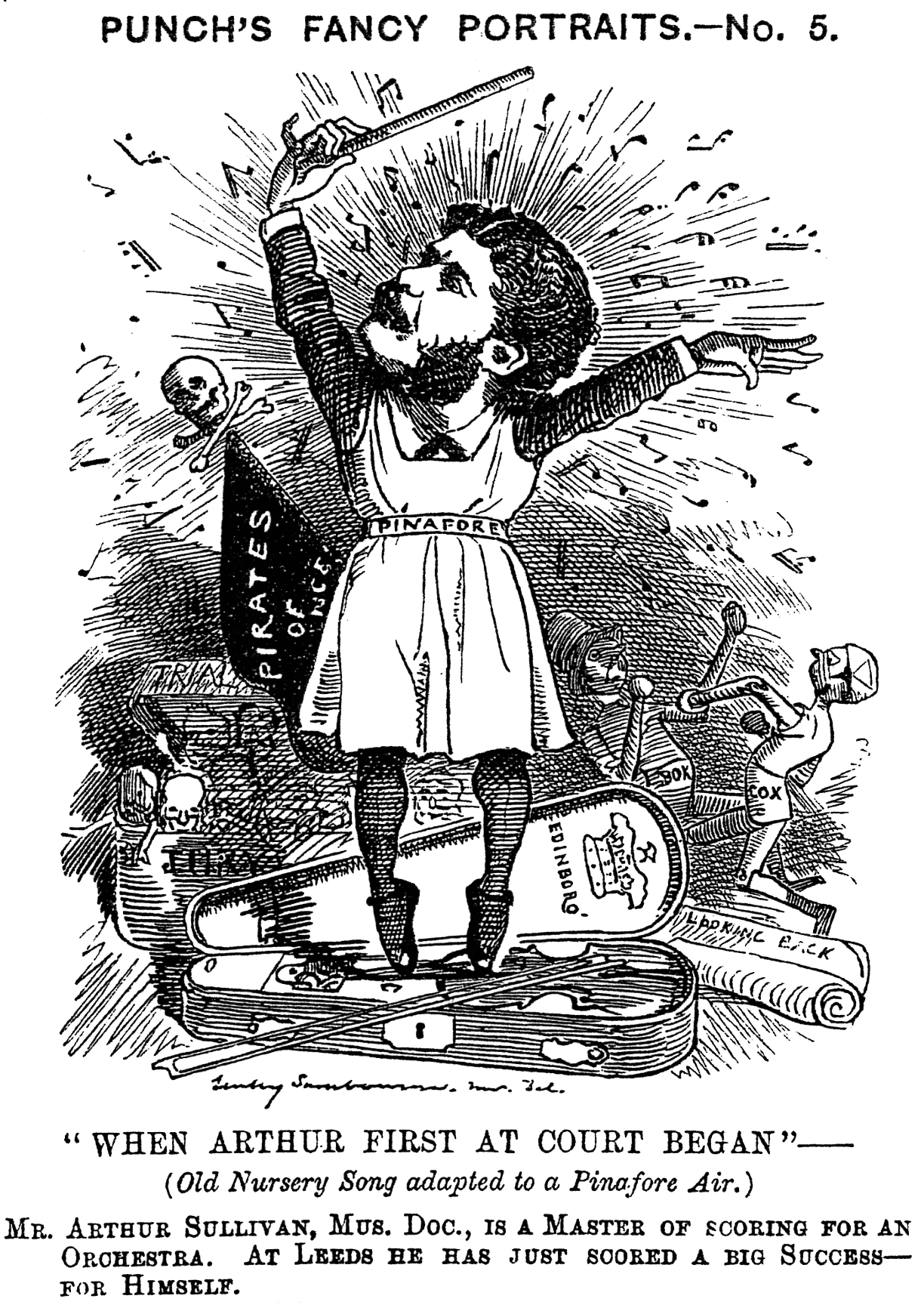
Punch cartoon mocking Sullivan for his focus on comic opera

Similarly, The Illustrated London News concluded that the production was a success and that the plot, though slight, served as a good vehicle for Gilbert's "caustic humour and quaint satire". It found that there was "much to call forth hearty laughter in the occasional satirical hits. ... Dr. Sullivan's music is as lively as the text to which it is set, with here and there a touch of sentimental expression ... The piece is well performed throughout." The Daily News, The Globe, The Times (which particularly praised Grossmith, Barrington and Everard) and The Standard concurred, the last commenting favourably on the chorus acting, which, it said, "adds to the reality of the illusion". The Times also noted that the piece was an early attempt at the establishment of a "national musical stage" with a libretto free from risqué French "improprieties" and without the "aid" of Italian and German musical models.

The Daily Telegraph and the Athenaeum, however, greeted the opera with only mixed praise. The Musical Times complained that the ongoing collaboration between Gilbert and Sullivan was "detrimental to the art-progress of either" because, although it was popular with audiences, "something higher is demanded for what is understood as 'comic opera'". The paper commented that Sullivan had "the true elements of an artist, which would be successfully developed were a carefully framed libretto presented to him for composition". It concluded, however, by saying how much it enjoyed the opera: "Having thus conscientiously discharged our duties as art-critics, let us at once proceed to say that H.M.S. Pinafore is an amusing piece of extravagance, and that the music floats it on merrily to the end". The Times and several of the other papers agreed that, while the piece was entertaining, Sullivan was capable of higher art. Only The Figaro was actively hostile to the new piece. Upon the publication of the vocal score, a review by The Academy joined the chorus of regret that Sullivan had sunk so low as to compose music for Pinafore and hoped that he would turn to projects "more worthy of his great ability". This criticism would follow Sullivan throughout his career.

The many unauthorised American productions of 1878–79 were of widely varying quality, and many of them were adaptations of the opera. One of the more "authentic" ones was the production by the Boston Ideal Opera Company, which was first formed to produce Pinafore. (Note: The company first performed Pinafore in November 1878 on a boat in a lake in Boston's Oakland Park.) It engaged well-regarded concert singers and opened on 14 April 1879 at the 3,000-seat Boston Theatre. The critics agreed that the company fulfilled its goals of presenting an "ideal" production. The Boston Journal reported that the audience was "wrought up by the entertainment to a point of absolute approval". The paper observed that it is a mistake to consider Pinafore a burlesque, "for while irresistibly comical it is not bouffe and requires to be handled with great care lest its delicate proportions be marred and its subtle quality of humor be lost". The Journal described the opera as "classical" in method and wrote that its "most exquisite satire" lay in its "imitation of the absurdities" of grand opera. The company went on to become one of the most successful touring companies in America. The first children's version in Boston became a sensation with both children and adult audiences, extending its run through the summer of 1879. The Boston Herald wrote that "the large audience of children and their elders went fairly wild with delight ... shrieks of laughter were repeatedly heard".

=== Subsequent reception ===
When Pinafore was first revived in London in 1887, it was already treated as a classic. The Illustrated London News observed that the opera had not been updated with new dialogue, jokes and songs, but concluded that this was for the best, as the public would have missed the "time-honoured jokes, such as 'Hardly Ever.' The Savoy has once more got a brilliant success." The Theatre concurred, stating that since the opera "has been heard in almost every part of this habitable globe and been enjoyed everywhere, there is not much occasion to descant". It called the revival a "most brilliant" success and predicted another long run.

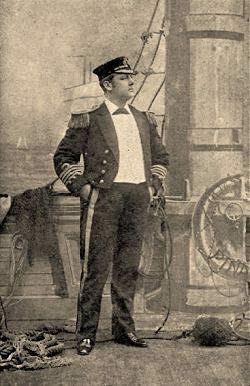
Rutland Barrington as Captain Corcoran in the first London revival, 1887

Reviewing the 1899 revival, The Athenaeum managed to praise the piece while joining in the musical establishment's critique of Sullivan. On the one hand, "The Pinafore ... sounds fresher than ever. The musical world has become serious – very serious – and it is indeed refreshing to hear a merry, humorous piece, and music, unassuming in character ... it is delicately scored, and in many ways displays ability of a high order". On the other hand, it wrote that if Sullivan had pursued the path of composing more serious music, like his symphony, "he would have produced still higher results; in like manner Pinafore set us wondering what the composer would have accomplished with a libretto of somewhat similar kind, but one giving him larger scope for the exercise of his gifts".

In 1911, H. L. Mencken wrote: "No other comic opera ever written – no other stage play, indeed, of any sort – was ever so popular. ... Pinafore ... has been given, and with great success, wherever there are theaters – from Moscow to Buenos Aires, from Cape Town to Shanghai; in Madrid, Ottawa and Melbourne; even in Paris, Rome, Vienna and Berlin." After the deaths of Gilbert and Sullivan, the D'Oyly Carte Opera Company retained exclusive rights to perform their operas in Great Britain until 1962, touring throughout Britain for most of the year and, beginning in 1919, often performing in London for a season of about four months. The Times gave the company's 1920 London production an enthusiastic review, saying that the audience was "enraptured", and regretting that Pinafore would be played for only two weeks. It praised the cast, singling out Leo Sheffield as the Captain, Henry Lytton as Sir Joseph, Elsie Griffin as Josephine, James Hay as Ralph, Bertha Lewis as Little Buttercup and the "splendid" choral tone. It concluded that the opera made a "rollicking climax to the season". Two years later, it gave an even more glowing report of that season's performances, calling Derek Oldham an "ideal hero" as Ralph, noting that Sydney Granville "fairly brought down the house" with his song, that Darrell Fancourt's Deadeye was "an admirably sustained piece of caricature" and that it was a "great pleasure" to hear the returning principals. A 1961 review of the company's Pinafore is much the same.

In 1879, J. C. Williamson acquired the exclusive performing rights to Pinafore in Australia and New Zealand. His first production earned public and critical acclaim. Williamson played Sir Joseph, and his wife, Maggie Moore played Josephine. Praising the production, Williamson, Moore and the other performers, the Sydney Morning Herald noted that the production, though "abounding in fun", was dignified and precise, especially compared with a previous "boisterous" unauthorized production, and that many numbers were encored and the laughter and applause from the "immense audience ... was liberally bestowed". Williamson's company continued to produce Pinafore in Australia, New Zealand and on tour into the 1960s with much success. Williamson said, "If you need money, then put on G&S". Meanwhile, Pinafore continued to garner praise outside Britain. The 1950s Danish version in Copenhagen, for example, was revived repeatedly, playing for well over 100 performances to "packed houses". Translations into German, Yiddish and many other languages, and professional productions in places as remote as Samarkand in Uzbekistan have been successful.

In the U.S., where Gilbert and Sullivan's performance copyright was never in force, Pinafore continued to be produced continuously by both professional and amateur companies. The New York Times, in a 1914 review, called a large-scale production at the 6,000-seat New York Hippodrome a "royal entertainment [that] comes up smiling". The opera had been turned into a "mammoth spectacle" with a chorus of hundreds and the famous Hippodrome tank providing a realistic harbour. Buttercup made her entrance by rowing over to the three-masted Pinafore, and Dick Deadeye was later thrown overboard with a real splash. The critic praised the hearty singing but noted that some subtlety is lost when the dialogue needs to be "shouted". The production took some liberties, including interpolated music from other Sullivan works. The paper concluded, "the mild satire of Pinafore is entertaining because it is universal". The same newspaper deemed Winthrop Ames' popular Broadway productions of Pinafore in the 1920s and 1930s "spectacular". Modern productions in America continue to be generally well received. The New York Times review of the New York Gilbert and Sullivan Players' 2008 season at New York City Center commented, "Gilbert's themes of class inequality, overbearing nationalism and incompetent authorities remain relevant, however absurdly treated. But the lasting appeal of Pinafore and its ilk is more a matter of his unmatched linguistic genius and Sullivan's generous supply of addictive melodies."

With the expiry of the copyrights, companies around the world have been free to produce Gilbert and Sullivan works and to adapt them as they please for almost 50 years. Productions of Pinafore, both amateur and professional, range from the traditional, in the D'Oyly Carte vein, to the broadly adapted, such as that of the very successful Essgee Entertainment (formed by Simon Gallaher) in Australia and Opera della Luna in Britain. Since its original production, H.M.S. Pinafore has remained one of Gilbert and Sullivan's most popular comic operas. Productions continue in large numbers around the world. In 2003 alone, The D'Oyly Carte Opera Company rented 224 sets of orchestra parts, mostly for productions of Pinafore, Pirates and Mikado. This does not take into account other rental companies and the theatre companies that borrow scores or have acquired their own, or that use only one or two pianos instead of an orchestra. Hundreds of productions of Pinafore are presented every year worldwide.

== Analysis ==
Theatre historian John Bush Jones wrote that Pinafore has "everything a musical theatregoer could ask for. An engaging and even relatively suspenseful story is populated with varied and well-drawn characters who speak and sing witty, literate, and often outrageously funny dialogue and lyrics [and] has a score that ... has plenty of tunes for the audience to go away humming". George Power, the tenor who created the role of Ralph Rackstraw, opined in later life that the secret of the success of the Savoy operas is the way in which "Sullivan entered into the spirit of Gilbert's topsy-turvy humour, and was pompous when Gilbert was sprightly, or, when Gilbert's satire was keenest and most acid, consciously wallowed in sentiment." Another commentator has suggested that the opera's enduring success lies in its focus on "mirth and silliness". Even the title of the piece is silly, applying the name of a little girl's garment, a pinafore, to the fearsome symbol of a naval warship, which usually bore names like Victory, Dreadnought, Audacious and Minotaur.

=== Satiric and comic themes ===
Gilbert's biographer Jane Stedman wrote that Pinafore is "satirically far more complex" than The Sorcerer. She commented that Gilbert uses several ideas and themes from his Bab Ballads, including the idea of gentlemanly behaviour of a captain towards his crew from "Captain Reece" (1868) and the exchange of ranks due to exchange at birth from "General John" (1867). Dick Deadeye, based on a character in "Woman's Gratitude" (1869), represents another of Gilbert's favorite (and semi-autobiographical) satiric themes: the misshapen misanthrope whose forbidding "face and form" makes him unpopular although he represents the voice of reason and common sense. Gilbert also borrows from his 1870 opera, The Gentleman in Black which includes the device of baby-switching.

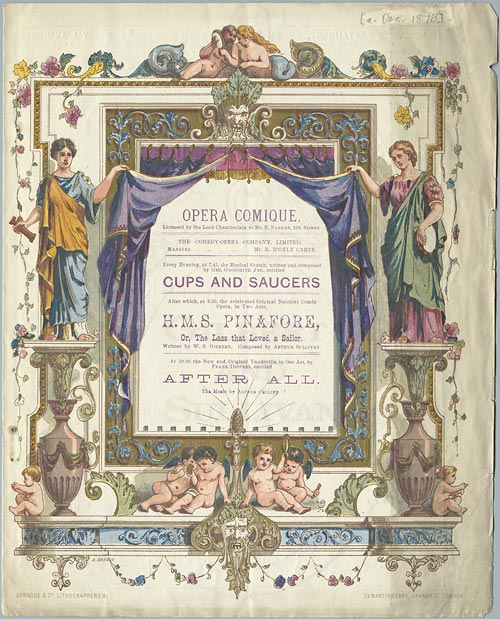
Souvenir programme cover from 1878 during the run of the original production

Historian H. M. Walbrook wrote in 1921 that Pinafore "satirizes the type of nautical drama of which Douglas Jerrold's Black-Eyed Susan is a typical instance, and the 'God's Englishman' sort of patriotism which consists in shouting a platitude, striking an attitude, and doing little or nothing to help one's country". G. K. Chesterton agreed that the satire is pointed at the selfishness of "being proud of yourself for being a citizen" of one's country, which requires no virtuous effort of will to resist the "temptations to belong to other nations" but is merely an excuse for pride. In 2005, Australian opera director Stuart Maunder noted the juxtaposition of satire and nationalism in the opera, saying, "they all sing 'He is an Englishman', and you know damn well they're sending it up, but the music is so military ... that you can't help but be swept up in that whole jingoism that is the British Empire." In addition, he argued that the song ties this theme into the main satire of class distinctions in the opera: "H.M.S. Pinafore is basically a satire on ... the British love of the class system. ... [O]f course [Ralph] can marry [the Captain's] daughter, because he's British, and therefore he's great'". Jacobs notes that Gilbert is lampooning the tradition of nautical melodrama in which the sailor's "patriotism guarantees his virtue". (Note: Crowther makes a point similar to Maunder's: "[T]hough Gilbert intended [the song] as a devastating parody of patriotic songs, the fervour of Sullivan's music often leads people to believe it a sincerely-meant patriotic song; and as the words and music pull the song in opposite directions the listener is left in a curiously ambiguous position, moved and amused simultaneously.")

One of Gilbert's favourite comic themes is the elevation of an unqualified person to a position of high responsibility. In The Happy Land (1873), for example, Gilbert describes a world in which government offices are awarded to the person who has the least qualification to hold each position. In particular, the one who has never heard of a ship is appointed to the cabinet post of First Lord of the Admiralty. (Note: Stedman, pp. 106–110; "My dear, it's one of the beautiful principles of our system of government never to appoint anybody to any post to which he is at all fitted. Our government offices are as so many elementary schools for the instruction of ministers. To take a minister who knows his duties, and to send him to an elementary school to learn them, is an obvious waste of educational power. Nature has pointed you out as eminently qualified for First Lord of the Admiralty, because you don't know anything about ships. You take office – you learn all about ships – and when you know all about ships, the opposition comes in, out you go, and somebody else who doesn't know anything about ships comes in and takes your place. That's how we educate our ministers.") In Pinafore, Gilbert revisits this theme in the character of Sir Joseph, who rises to the same position by "never go[ing] to sea". In later Gilbert and Sullivan operas, the characters Major-General Stanley in Pirates, and Ko-Ko in The Mikado, are similarly appointed to high office though lacking the necessary qualifications. Gilbert also pokes fun at party politics, implying that when Sir Joseph "always voted at [his] party's call", he sacrificed his personal integrity. The "commercial middle class" (which was Gilbert's main audience) is treated as satirically as are social climbers and the great unwashed. In addition, the apparent age difference between Ralph and the Captain, even though they were babies nursed together, satirises the variable age of Thaddeus in The Bohemian Girl. The Times wrote, in reviewing the 1929 production, that Pinafore was quintessentially Gilbertian in that the absurdities of a "paternal" Captain and the "ethics ... of all romanticism" are accepted "unflinchingly" and taken to their logical conclusion: "It is the reference to actuality that is essential; without it, the absurdity will not stand starkly out".

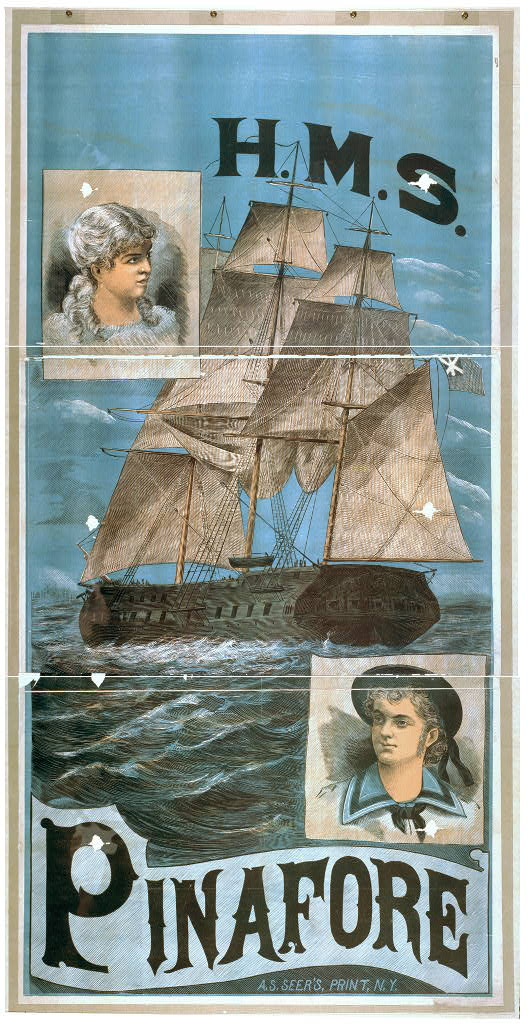
Theatre poster for an American production, c. 1879

A theme that pervades the opera is the treatment of love across different social ranks. In the previous Gilbert and Sullivan opera, The Sorcerer, a love potion causes trouble by inducing the villagers and wedding guests to fall in love with people of different social classes. In Pinafore, the captain's daughter, Josephine, loves and is loved by a common sailor, but she dutifully tells him, "your proffered love I haughtily reject". He expresses his devotion to her in a poetic and moving speech that ends with "I am a British sailor, and I love you". It finally turns out that he is of a higher rank than she. This is a parody of the Victorian "equality" drama, such as Lord Lytton's The Lady of Lyons (1838), where the heroine rejects a virtuous peasant who makes a similarly moving speech, ending with "I am a peasant!" It then turns out that he has become her social superior. Furthermore, in Pinafore, Sir Joseph assures Josephine that "love levels all ranks". In Tom Taylor's The Serf, the heroine again loves a worthy peasant who turns out to be of high rank, and she declares happily at the end that "love levels all". In a satire of the libertarian traditions of nautical melodrama, Sir Joseph tells the crew of the Pinafore that they are "any man's equal" (excepting his), and he writes a song for them that glorifies the British sailor. Conversely, he brings the proud captain down a notch by making him "dance a hornpipe on the cabin table". Jones notes that the union between Ralph and Josephine "becomes acceptable only through the absurd second-act revelation of Buttercup's inadvertent switching of the infants" and concludes that Gilbert is a "conservative satirist [who] ultimately advocated preserving the status quo ... [and] set out to show [that] love definitely does not level all ranks".

There is a divide among Gilbert and Sullivan scholars as to whether Gilbert is, as Jones argues, a supporter of the status quo whose focus is merely to entertain or, on the other hand, predominantly to satirise and protest "against the follies of his age". The Gilbert scholar Andrew Crowther posits that this disagreement arises from Gilbert's "techniques of inversion – with irony and topsyturvydom", which lead to "the surface meaning of his writings" being "the opposite of their underlying meaning". Crowther argues that Gilbert desires to "celebrate" society's norms while, at the same time, satirising these conventions. In Pinafore, which established many patterns for the later Savoy operas, Gilbert found a way to express his own conflict that "also had tremendous appeal to the general public". He creates "a highly intelligent parody of nautical melodrama ... [though] controlled by the conventions it mocks". While nautical melodrama exalts the common sailor, in Pinafore Gilbert makes the proponent of equality, Sir Joseph, a pompous and misguided member of the ruling class who, hypocritically, cannot apply the idea of equality to himself. (Note: Crowther notes that Alexis in The Sorcerer is also such a "misguided superior". See also Stedman, p. 162.) The hero, Ralph, is convinced of his equality by Sir Joseph's foolish pronouncements and declares his love for his Captain's daughter, throwing over the accepted "fabric of social order". At this point, Crowther suggests, the logic of Gilbert's satiric argument should result in Ralph's arrest. But to satisfy convention, Gilbert creates an obvious absurdity: the captain and Ralph were switched as babies. By an "accident of birth", Ralph is suddenly an appropriate husband for Josephine, and both the social order and the desire for a romantic happy ending are satisfied at once. Crowther concludes, "We have an opera which uses all the conventions of melodrama and ridicules them; but in the end it is difficult to see which has won out, the conventions or the ridicule." Thus, Pinafore found broadbased success by appealing to the intellectual theatregoer seeking satire, the middle-class theatre-goer looking for a comfortable confirmation of the "existing social order" and the working-class audience who saw a satisfying melodramatic victory for the common man.

=== Songs and musical analysis ===
According to musicologist Arthur Jacobs, Gilbert's plot "admirably sparked off Sullivan's genius". Sullivan embraces the nautical setting; in "We Sail the Ocean Blue", for example, he "presents his twist on a traditional sea shanty". In the Captain's opening song, "I am the Captain of the Pinafore", he admits that his gentlemanliness "never ... well, hardly ever" gives way to swearing at his men, and although he has experience at sea, he "hardly ever" suffers from seasickness. Sullivan "unerringly found the right musical setting for the key phrase 'What never?' ... cunningly sharpened ... through the chromatic touch on the bassoon." Audrey Williamson argued that the music of Pinafore is quintessentially English and free of European influences throughout most of the score, from the "glee" for Ralph, the Boatswain and the Carpenter, to "For He Is an Englishman".

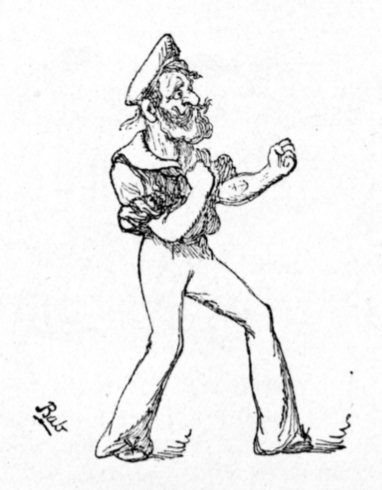
Gilbert's Illustration of "A British tar" (1906)

The best-known songs from the opera include "I'm called Little Buttercup", a waltz tune introducing the character, which Sullivan repeats in the entr'acte and in the Act II finale to imprint the melody on the mind of the audience; and "A British tar" (a glee for three men describing the ideal sailor), composed by Sir Joseph "to encourage independent thought and action in the lower branches of the service, and to teach the principle that a British sailor is any man's equal, excepting mine". Sullivan's voicing advances the satiric lyric, which mocks the "equality" plays while underlining the hypocrisy of Sir Joseph. Another popular number is Sir Joseph's song "When I was a Lad", recounting the meteoric rise of his career, which bears similarities to that of W. H. Smith, the civilian news entrepreneur who had risen to the position of First Lord of the Admiralty in 1877.

In Pinafore, Sullivan exploits minor keys for comic effect, for instance in "Kind Captain, I've important information". Further, he achieves a musical surprise when he uses the subdominant minor in "Sorry her lot". The musicologist Gervase Hughes was impressed with the introduction to the opening chorus which includes "a rousing nautical tune ... in a key of no nonsense, C major ... a modulation to the mediant minor, where to our surprise a plaintive oboe gives us the first verse of "Sorry her lot" in 2/4 [time]. After this closes on the local dominant B major the violins (still in 2/4) introduce us to Little Buttercup ... meeting her under these conditions one would hardly expect her to blossom out later as a queen of the waltz." He continues, "the bassoon and basses ... assert vigorously who is the Captain of the Pinafore ... in the improbable key of A flat minor. ... Buttercup makes a last despairing attempt to make herself heard in D flat minor, but the others have never known that such an outlandish key existed. So in a flash they all go back to C major on a good old 6/4".

According to Jacobs, "Ralph, Captain Corcoran, Sir Joseph and Josephine all live in their interactive music (particularly 'Never mind the why and wherefore'), and almost as much musical resource is lavished on two characters parodied from opera or melodrama, Little Buttercup with 'gypsy blood in her veins' and the heavy-treading Dick Deadeye." Jacobs also opined that the leading tone that begins "Never mind the why and wherefore" "serves to emphasize the phrase like a Johann Strauss-ian grace-note". The Sullivan scholar David Russell Hulme noted Sullivan's parody of operatic styles, "particularly the Handelian recitatives and the elopement scene (evocative of so many nocturnal operatic conspiracies), but best of all is the travesty of the patriotic tune in 'For he is an Englishman!'" Buttercup's Act II song, in which she reveals the dark secret of the baby-switching is preceded by a quote from Franz Schubert's "Erlkönig" and also parodies the opera Il trovatore. Jacobs notes that Sullivan also adds his own humorous touches to the music by setting commonplace expressions in "Donizettian recitative". But on the serious side, he enhances the moments of true emotional climax, as in Josephine's Act II aria, and added musical interest to concerted numbers by "subtly shifting the rhythms and bar groupings."

== Revisions and cut material ==
=== Ballad for Captain Corcoran, "Reflect, my child" ===
During rehearsals for the original production, Gilbert added a ballad for Captain Corcoran in which he urged his daughter to forget the common sailor with whom she is in love, because "at every step, he would commit solecisms that society would never pardon." The ballad was meant to be sung between No. 5 and No. 6 of the current score, but it was cut before opening night. The words survive in the libretto that was deposited with the Lord Chamberlain for licensing. Before 1999, all that was known to survive of Sullivan's setting was a copy of the leader violin part.

In April 1999, Sullivan scholars Bruce I. Miller and Helga J. Perry announced that they had discovered a nearly complete orchestration – lacking only the second violin part – in a private collection of early band parts. These materials, with a conjectural reconstruction of the partially lost vocal lines and second violin part, were later published and professionally recorded. This piece has now been performed a number of times by amateur and professional companies, although it has not become a standard addition to the traditional scores or recordings.

=== Dialogue for Cousin Hebe ===
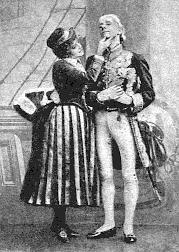
Bond as Hebe with Grossmith as Sir Joseph, 1887 revival

In the licensing copy of the libretto, Sir Joseph's cousin Hebe had lines of dialogue in several scenes in Act II. In the scene that follows No. 14 ("Things are seldom what they seem"), she accompanied Sir Joseph onstage and echoed the First Lord's dissatisfaction with Josephine. After several interruptions, Sir Joseph urged her to be quiet, eliciting the response "Crushed again!" Gilbert would later re-use this passage for Lady Jane in Patience. Hebe was also assigned several lines of dialogue after No. 18 ("Carefully on tiptoe stealing") and again after No. 19 ("Farewell, my own").

Late in rehearsals for the original production, Jessie Bond assumed the role of Hebe, replacing Mrs Howard Paul. Bond, who at this point in her career was known primarily as a concert singer and had little experience as an actress, did not feel capable of performing dialogue, and these passages were revised to cut Hebe's dialogue. Hebe's cut dialogue is occasionally restored in modern performances.

=== Recitative preceding the Act II finale ===
The dialogue preceding the Act II finale, starting with "Here, take her sir, and mind you treat her kindly", was originally recitative. The music for this passage was printed in the first edition of the vocal score as No. 20a. Shortly after opening night, the recitative was dropped, and the lines thereafter were performed as spoken dialogue. In modern productions, the recitative is occasionally restored in place of the dialogue.

== Recordings ==
There have been numerous recordings of Pinafore since 1907. Ian Bradley counted seventeen recordings of the opera available on CD in 2005.

"Pinafore airs", pt. 1
Part 1 of a 4-part recording of H.M.S. Pinafore created by Edison Records in 1911. Includes "We sail the ocean blue" "Hail, men-o'-war's men", "I'm called Little Buttercup" and "A maiden fair to see"

"Pinafore airs", pt. 2
Part 2 of the 4-part recording. Includes "My gallant crew, good morning", "I am the Captain of the Pinafore", "Sorry her lot" (second verse, beginning "Sad is the hour"), "Over the bright blue sea" and "I am the monarch of the sea"

The 1930 recording is notable for preserving the performances of the D'Oyly Carte Opera Company stars of the era. The 1960 D'Oyly Carte recording, which contains all the dialogue, has been repeatedly praised by reviewers. The 1994 Mackerras recording, featuring grand opera singers in the principal roles, is musically well regarded. The 2000 D'Oyly Carte recording also contains complete dialogue and the first recording of the "lost" ballad for Captain Corcoran, "Reflect, my child", as a bonus track. A 1957 Danish-language recording of the opera is one of the few foreign-language professional recordings of Gilbert and Sullivan.

In 1939, Pinafore was chosen by NBC as one of the earliest operas ever broadcast on American television, but no recording is known to have been saved. The 1973 D'Oyly Carte video recording, directed by Michael Heyland, features the company's staging of the period, but some reviewers find it dull. It is, however, one of only three video or film recordings of a Gilbert and Sullivan opera by the D'Oyly Carte Opera Company. In 1982, Brent Walker Productions produced Pinafore as part of its series of Gilbert and Sullivan television films. According to discographer Marc Shepherd, the Pinafore video "is widely considered one of the worst" in the series. (Note: Brent Walker Productions filmed a series of television productions of the Gilbert and Sullivan operas in 1982 and 1983. This is the most complete professional set of Gilbert and Sullivan videos.) More recent professional productions have been recorded on video by the International Gilbert and Sullivan Festival.

Selected recordings

- 1930 D'Oyly Carte – London Symphony Orchestra; Conductor: Malcolm Sargent
- 1958 Sargent/Glyndebourne – Pro Arte Orchestra, Glyndebourne Festival Chorus; Conductor: Sir Malcolm Sargent
- 1960 D'Oyly Carte (with dialogue) – New Symphony Orchestra of London; Conductor: Isidore Godfrey
- 1972 G&S for All – G&S Festival Chorus & Orchestra; Conductor: Peter Murray
- 1973 D'Oyly Carte (video) – Conductor: Royston Nash
- 1981 Stratford Festival (video) – Conductor: Berthold Carrière; Director: Leon Major
- 1987 New Sadler's Wells Opera – Conductor: Simon Phipps
- 1994 Mackerras/Telarc – Orchestra and Chorus of the Welsh National Opera; Conductor: Sir Charles Mackerras
- 1997 Essgee Entertainment (video; adapted) – Conductor: Kevin Hocking
- 2000 D'Oyly Carte (with dialogue) – Conductor: John Owen Edwards

== Adaptations ==
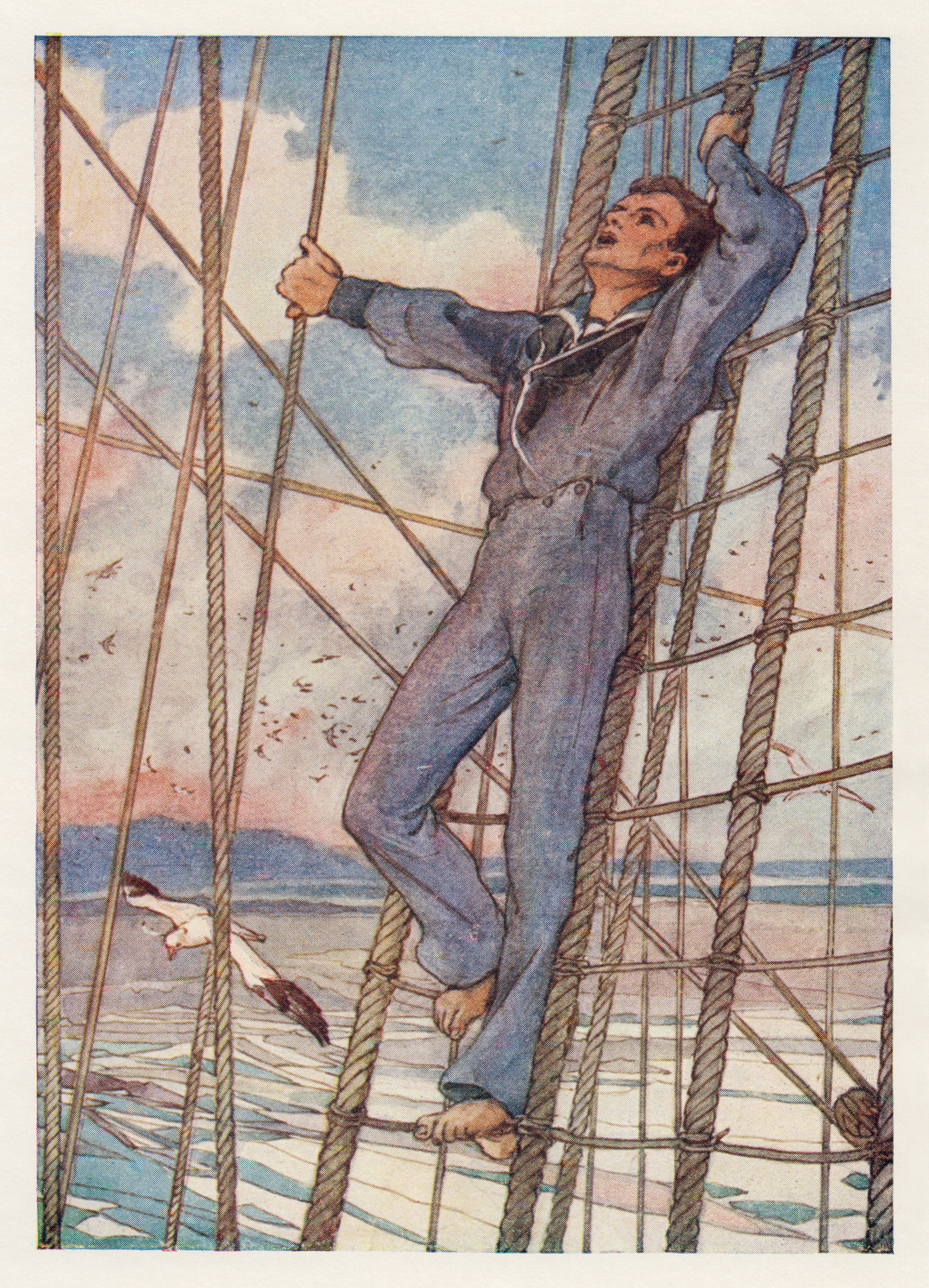
Frontispiece by Alice B. Woodward to The Pinafore Picture Book, 1908

H.M.S. Pinafore has been adapted many times. W. S. Gilbert wrote a 1909 children's book called The Pinafore Picture Book, illustrated by Alice Woodward, which retells the story of Pinafore, giving considerable backstory details not found in the libretto. Many other children's books have since been written retelling the story of Pinafore or adapting characters or events from Pinafore.

Many musical theatre adaptations have been produced since the original opera. Notable examples include an 1880 Canadian political satire called H.M.S. Parliament. A 1945 Broadway musical adapted by George S. Kaufman, called Hollywood Pinafore, used Sullivan's music. This was revived several times, including in London in 1998. Another 1945 Broadway musical adaptation, Memphis Bound, was written by Don Walker and starred Bill Robinson and an all-black cast. In 1940, the American Negro Light Opera Association produced the first of several productions set in the Caribbean Sea, Tropical Pinafore. An early Yiddish adaptation of Pinafore, called Der Shirtz (Yiddish for "apron") was written by Miriam Walowit in 1949 for a Brooklyn Hadassah group; they toured the adaptation, and they recorded 12 of the songs. In the 1970s, Al Grand was inspired by this recording and urged the Gilbert and Sullivan Long Island Light Opera Company to perform these songs. He later translated the missing songs and dialogue, with Bob Tartell, and the show has been toured widely under the name Der Yiddisher Pinafore. The group have continued to produce this adaptation for over two decades, in which "He is an Englishman" becomes "Er Iz a Guter Yid" ("He is a good Jew").

Essgee Entertainment produced an adapted version of Pinafore in 1997 in Australia and New Zealand that has been much revived. Another musical adaptation is Pinafore! (A Saucy, Sexy, Ship-Shape New Musical), adapted by Mark Savage. It was first performed at the Celebration Theater in Los Angeles on 7 September 2001, directed by Savage, where it ran with great success for nine months. It then played in Chicago and New York in 2003. In this adaptation, only one character is female, and all but one of the male characters are gay. An original cast recording was issued in 2002 by Belva Records. Pinafore Swing is a musical with music arranged by Sarah Travis. It premiered at the Watermill Theatre in England in 2004 in a production directed by John Doyle. The adaptation, set in 1944, changes the characters into members of a band entertaining the sailors on a World War II troop ship in the Atlantic. The reduced-size acting cast also serve as the orchestra for the singing roles, and the music is infused with swing rhythms. Numerous productions in recent decades have been set to parody Star Trek or Star Wars. An adaptation titled H.M.S. Pinafore, or Dauntless Dick Deadeye, was produced in 2005 at the Regent's Park Open Air Theatre; extensive additional Gilbert-style dialogue by Herbert Appleman makes "raconteur" Deadeye the central character. Ian Talbot directed, and Gary Wilmot starred as Deadeye, with Scarlett Strallen as Josephine, Desmond Barrit as Sir Joseph and Leslie Nichol as Buttercup. Both the production and Strallen were nominated for 2006 Olivier Awards.

== Cultural impact ==
=== Development of the modern musical ===
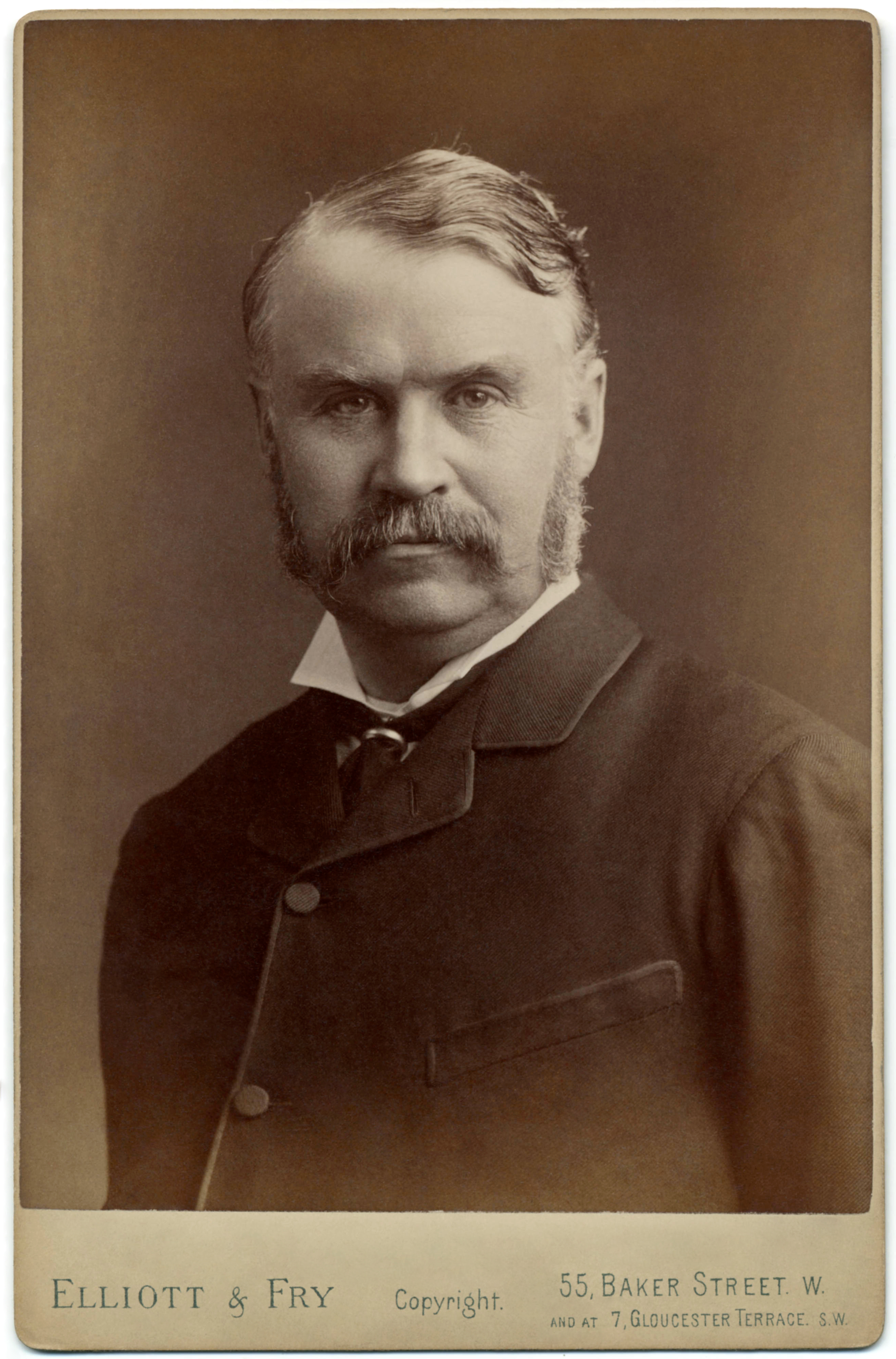
Cabinet card of W. S. Gilbert in about 1880 by Elliott & Fry

Among its other influences on popular culture, Pinafore had perhaps its most profound influence on the development of musical theatre. According to theatre historian John Kenrick, Pinafore "became an international sensation, reshaping the commercial theater in both England and the United States." The music writer Andrew Lamb notes, "The success of H.M.S. Pinafore in 1879 established British comic opera alongside French opéra bouffe throughout the English-speaking world". The historian John Bush Jones opines that Pinafore and the other Savoy operas demonstrate that musical theatre "can address contemporary social and political issues without sacrificing entertainment value" and that Pinafore created the model for a new kind of musical theatre, the "integrated" musical, where "book, lyrics, and music combined to form an integral whole". He adds that its "unprecedented ... popularity fostered an American audience for musical theatre, while the show itself became a model for form, content, and even intention of ... musicals ever since, especially socially relevant musicals." Its popularity also led to the musical theatre adaptations of Pinafore described above, musicals in which the story line involves a production of Pinafore and other musicals that parody the opera or that use or adapt its music. (Note: A 1938 Broadway show used six songs from Pinafore. Other examples include The Pirates of Pinafore, The Pinafore Pirates (which Bradley calls "splendid" and describes in detail in Bradley (2005), pp. 174–175), Mutiny on the Pinafore, and H.M.S. Dumbledore (2004) by Caius Marcius.) The first such parody was a short-lived burlesque presented at the Opera Comique in 1882, called The Wreck of the Pinafore by William Horace Lingard and Luscombe Searelle; the opera's characters are shipwrecked on a desert island. It was described by The Era as "chiefly remarkable for its impudence".

=== Literary and political references ===
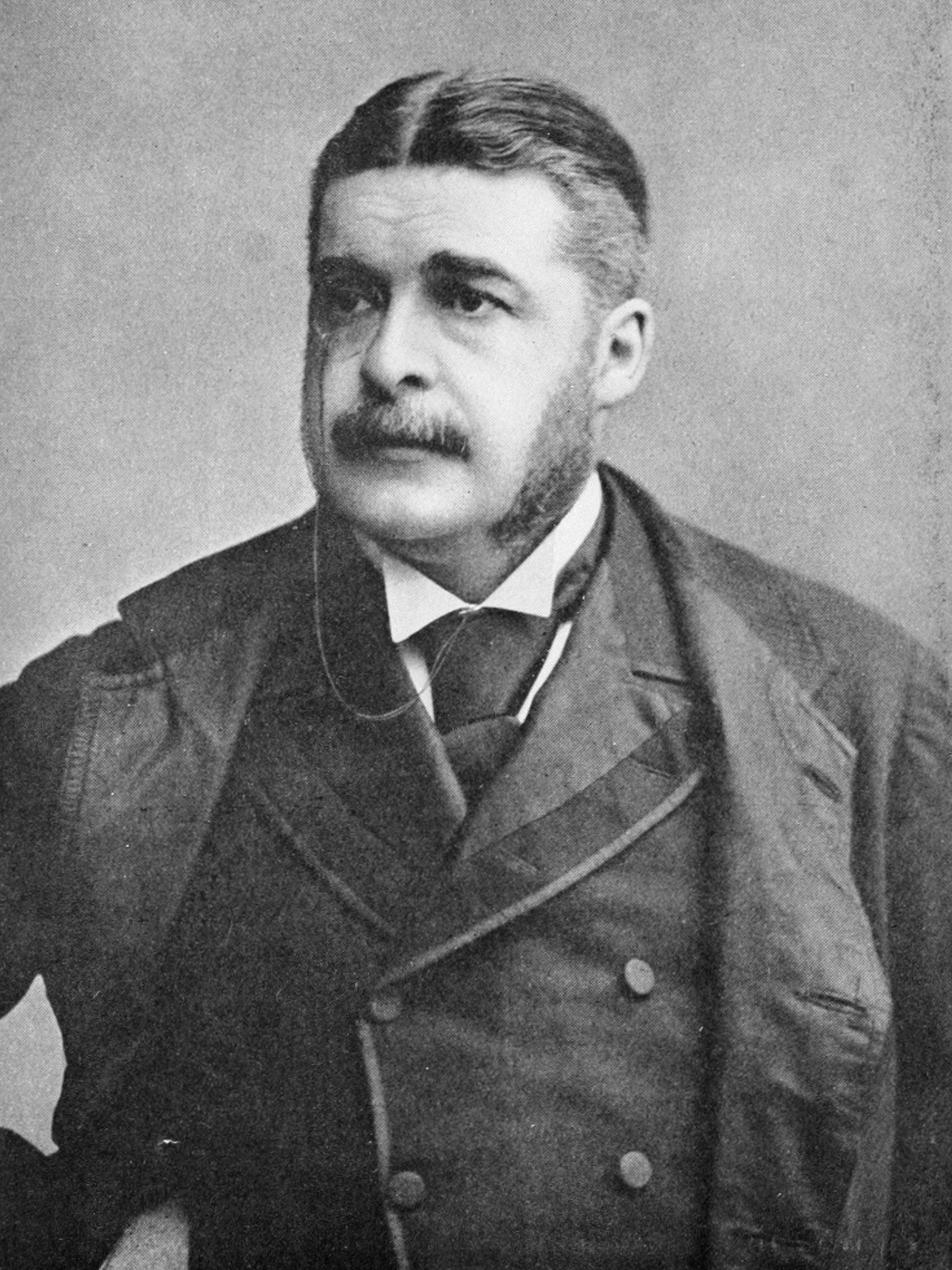
Arthur Seymour Sullivan

The opera's popularity has led to the widespread parody and pastiche of its songs in comedy routines, literature and other media. Many comedians have used Pinafore songs for comic and satiric effect. For example, in his comedy album My Son, the Celebrity, Allan Sherman parodies "When I Was a Lad" from the point of view of a young man who goes to an Ivy League school and then rises to prominence in business. At the end of the song, he "thanks old Yale", "thanks the Lord" and thanks his father, "who is chairman of the board". Literary references to Pinafore songs include Harris's attempt to sing "When I Was a Lad" in Jerome K. Jerome's Three Men in a Boat. Another is found in the story "Runaround" from I, Robot by Isaac Asimov, where a robot sings part of "I'm Called Little Buttercup". Pinafore and its songs have been performed by rock musicians such as Todd Rundgren, Taj Mahal and Michele Gray Rundgren, who performed "Never Mind the Why and Wherefore" on Night Music (Sunday Night) in 1989.

Political references include a 1996 satiric pastiche of "When I Was a Lad" aimed at Tony Blair by Virginia Bottomley, heritage secretary under John Major. Sporting references include a racehorse named "H.M.S. Pinafore". Pinafore songs and images have been used extensively in advertising. According to Jones, "Pinafore launched the first media blitz in the United States" beginning in 1879, and recent ads include a television campaign for Terry's Chocolate Orange featuring a pastiche of "When I Was a Lad". Pinafore-themed merchandise includes trading cards that were created in the 1880s.

=== Film and television references ===
Songs from Pinafore have been used to give period flavor to such films as the 1981 historical film Chariots of Fire, in which the protagonist, Harold Abrahams, and others from Cambridge University, sing "He Is an Englishman". This song also features at the end of the 1983 BBC drama An Englishman Abroad. In the 2003 movie Peter Pan, the Darling family sings "When I Was a Lad". In Wyatt Earp (1994), the famed lawman meets his future wife when he sees her playing in an early production of Pinafore. A 1953 biopic, The Story of Gilbert and Sullivan, uses music from Pinafore.

Characters also sing songs from Pinafore in such popular films as Raiders of the Lost Ark (1981) and Star Trek: Insurrection (1998), where Captain Picard and Lt. Commander Worf sing part of "A British Tar" to distract a malfunctioning Lt. Commander Data. The Good Shepherd (2006) depicts an all-male version of Pinafore at Yale University in 1939; Matt Damon's character plays Little Buttercup, singing in falsetto. Judy Garland sings "I Am the Monarch of the Sea" in the 1963 film I Could Go On Singing. The soundtrack of the 1992 thriller The Hand that Rocks the Cradle prominently features songs and music from Pinafore, and the father and daughter characters sing "I Am the Captain of the Pinafore" together. The 1976 animated film by Ronald Searle called Dick Deadeye, or Duty Done is based on the character and songs from Pinafore. In the 1988 drama Permanent Record, a high school class performs Pinafore.

Television series that include substantial Pinafore references include The West Wing, for example in the 2000 episode "And It's Surely to Their Credit", where "He Is an Englishman" is used throughout and quoted (or paraphrased) in the episode's title. Among other notable examples of the use of songs from Pinafore on television are several popular animated shows. In the "Cape Feare" episode of The Simpsons, Bart stalls his would-be killer Sideshow Bob with a "final request" that Bob sing him the entire score of Pinafore. Similarly, the 1993 "HMS Yakko" episode of Animaniacs consists of pastiches of songs from H.M.S. Pinafore and The Pirates of Penzance. In a Family Guy episode, "The Thin White Line" (2001), Stewie sings a pastiche of "My Gallant Crew". Stewie also sings "I Am the Monarch of the Sea" (including the ladies' part, in falsetto) in Stewie Griffin: The Untold Story. A 1986 Mr. Belvedere episode, "The Play", concerns a production of H.M.S. Pinafore, and several of the songs are performed. In 1955, NBC broadcast a variety special including a 20-minute compressed jazz version, "H.M.S. Pinafore in Jazz", produced and directed by Max Liebman, starring Perry Como, Buddy Hackett, Kitty Kallen, Bill Hayes, Pat Carroll and Herb Shriner.

== Historical casting ==
The following tables show the most prominent cast members of significant D'Oyly Carte Opera Company productions and tours at various times through to the company's 1982 closure:

Role	Opera Comique 1878	New York 1879	Savoy Theatre 1887	Savoy Theatre 1899	Savoy Theatre 1908
Sir Joseph	George Grossmith	J. H. Ryley	George Grossmith	Walter Passmore	Charles H. Workman
Captain Corcoran	Rutland Barrington	Sgr. Brocolini	Rutland Barrington	Henry Lytton	Rutland Barrington
Ralph Rackstraw	George Power	Hugh Talbot	J. G. Robertson	Robert Evett	Henry Herbert
Dick Deadeye	Richard Temple	J. Furneaux Cook	Richard Temple	Richard Temple	Henry Lytton
Boatswain/ Bill Bobstay	Fred Clifton	Fred Clifton	Richard Cummings	W. H. Leon	Leicester Tunks
Carpenter/ Bob Beckett	Aeneas J. Dymott	Mr. Cuthbert	Rudolph Lewis	Powis Pinder	Fred Hewett
Midshipmite/ Tom Tucker	Master Fitzaltamont (Note: The Midshipmite, Tom Tucker, is traditionally played by a child. "Fitzaltamont" was likely a pseudonym used to protect the child's identity, as the same name appears on programmes of several provincial touring companies. No names are listed for his role in later productions.)				
Josephine	Emma Howson	Blanche Roosevelt	Geraldine Ulmar	Ruth Vincent	Elsie Spain
Hebe	Jessie Bond	Jessie Bond	Jessie Bond	Emmie Owen	Jessie Rose
Buttercup	Harriett Everard	Alice Barnett	Rosina Brandram	Rosina Brandram	Louie René

Role	D'Oyly Carte 1915 tour	D'Oyly Carte 1925 tour	D'Oyly Carte 1935 tour	D'Oyly Carte 1950 tour
Sir Joseph	Henry Lytton	Henry Lytton	Martyn Green	Martyn Green
Captain Corcoran	Leicester Tunks	Leo Sheffield	Leslie Rands	Richard Watson
Ralph Rackstraw	Walter Glynne	Charles Goulding	John Dean	Herbert Newby
Dick Deadeye	Leo Sheffield	Darrell Fancourt	Darrell Fancourt	Darrell Fancourt
Boatswain	Frederick Hobbs	Henry Millidge	Richard Walker	Stanley Youngman
Carpenter	George Sinclair	Patrick Colbert	L. Radley Flynn	L. Radley Flynn
Josephine	Phyllis Smith	Elsie Griffin	Ann Drummond-Grant	Muriel Harding
Hebe	Nellie Briercliffe	Aileen Davies	Marjorie Eyre	Joan Gillingham
Buttercup	Bertha Lewis	Bertha Lewis	Dorothy Gill	Ella Halman

Role	D'Oyly Carte 1958 tour	D'Oyly Carte 1965 tour	D'Oyly Carte 1975 tour	D'Oyly Carte 1982 tour
Sir Joseph	Peter Pratt	John Reed	John Reed	James Conroy-Ward
Captain Corcoran	Jeffrey Skitch	Alan Styler	Michael Rayner	Clive Harre
Ralph Rackstraw	Thomas Round	David Palmer	Meston Reid	Meston Reid
Dick Deadeye	Donald Adams	Donald Adams	John Ayldon	John Ayldon
Boatswain	George Cook	George Cook	Jon Ellison	Michael Buchan
Carpenter	Jack Habbick	Anthony Raffell	John Broad	Michael Lessiter
Josephine	Jean Hindmarsh	Ann Hood	Pamela Field	Vivian Tierney
Hebe	Joyce Wright	Pauline Wales	Patricia Leonard	Roberta Morrell
Buttercup	Ann Drummond-Grant	Christene Palmer	Lyndsie Holland	Patricia Leonard

== Notes, references and sources ==
=== Sources ===
- Ainger, Michael (2002). Gilbert and Sullivan – A Dual Biography. Oxford University Press. ISBN 0-19-514769-3.
- Allen, Reginald (1975). The First Night Gilbert and Sullivan (2nd ed.). Chappell & Co. Ltd. ISBN 0-903443-10-4.
- Allen, Reginald (1979). Gilbert and Sullivan in America, The Story of the First D'Oyly Carte Opera Company American Tour. The Pierpont Morgan Library. ISBN 0-686-70604-8.
- Arnold, David L. G. (2003). "Use a pen, Sideshow Bob: The Simpsons and the Threat of High Culture". In Alberti, John (ed.). Leaving Springfield: The Simpsons and the Possibility of Oppositional Culture. Wayne State University Press. ISBN 0-8143-2849-0.
- Baily, Leslie (1966). The Gilbert and Sullivan Book (new ed.). London: Spring Books. ISBN 0-500-13046-9.
- Bordman, Gerald (1981). American Operetta: From H. M. S. Pinafore to Sweeney Todd. Oxford University Press. ISBN 0-7351-0280-5.
- Bradley, Ian (1996). The Complete Annotated Gilbert and Sullivan. Oxford University Press. ISBN 0-19-816503-X.
- Bradley, Ian (2005). Oh Joy! Oh Rapture!: The Enduring Phenomenon of Gilbert and Sullivan. Oxford University Press. ISBN 0-19-516700-7.
- Crowther, Andrew (2000). Contradiction Contradicted – The Plays of W. S. Gilbert. Associated University Presses. ISBN 0-8386-3839-2.
- Cellier, François; Cunningham Bridgeman (1914). Gilbert and Sullivan and Their Operas. Little, Brown and Company.
- Dark, Sidney; Rowland Grey (1923). W. S. Gilbert: His Life and Letters. Methuen & Co. Ltd. ISBN 0-405-08430-7.
- Dillard, Philip H. (1991). How Quaint the Ways of Paradox!. The Scarecrow Press, Inc. ISBN 0-8108-2445-0.
- Fitz-Gerald, S. J. Adair (1924). The Story of the Savoy Opera. Stanley Paul & Co., Ltd. ISBN 0-306-79543-4.
- Gänzl, Kurt (1986). The British Musical Theatre – Volume I: 1865–1914. Oxford University Press. ISBN 0-19-520509-X.
- Gänzl, Kurt (1995). Gänzl's Book of the Broadway Musical: 75 Favorite Shows, from H.M.S. Pinafore to Sunset Boulevard. Schirmer. ISBN 0-02-870832-6.
- Holden, Amanda; Kenyon, Nicholas; Walsh, Stephen, eds. (1993). The Viking Opera Guide. Viking. ISBN 0-670-81292-7.
- Hughes, Gervase (1960). The Music of Arthur Sullivan. New York: St. Martin's Press.
- Jacobs, Arthur (1986). Arthur Sullivan – A Victorian Musician. Oxford University Press. ISBN 0-19-282033-8.
- Jones, John Bush (2003). Our Musicals Ourselves. Brandeis University Press. ISBN 1-58465-311-6.
- Joseph, Tony (2004). The D'Oyly Carte Opera Company 1875–1982. Bunthorne Books. ISBN 0-9507992-1-1.
- Lamb, Andrew (Spring 1986). "From Pinafore to Porter: United States – United Kingdom Interactions in Musical Theater, 1879–1929". American Music. 4 (1): 34–49. doi:10.2307/3052183. JSTOR 3052183.
- Lawrence, Elwood P. (December 1971). "The Happy Land: W. S. Gilbert as Political Satirist". Victorian Studies. 15 (2): 161–183. JSTOR 3825977.
- Mander, Raymond; Joe Richardson (1962). A Picture history of Gilbert and Sullivan. Vista Books.
- Rees, Terence (1964). Thespis – A Gilbert & Sullivan Enigma. London: Dillon's University Bookshop.
- Rollins, Cyril; R. John Witts (1962). The D'Oyly Carte Opera Company in Gilbert and Sullivan Operas: A Record of Productions, 1875–1961. Michael Joseph. Also, five supplements, privately printed.
- Sadie, Stanley, ed. (1992). The New Grove Dictionary of Opera. Oxford University Press. ISBN 0-19-522186-9.
- Shepherd, Marc; Michael Walters, eds. (2015). The Variorum Gilbert & Sullivan. Vol. 1. New York: Oakapple Press.
- Stedman, Jane W. (1996). W. S. Gilbert, A Classic Victorian & His Theatre. Oxford University Press. ISBN 0-19-816174-3.
- Walbrook, H. M. (1922). Gilbert & Sullivan Opera, A History and a Comment. F. V. White & Co. Ltd.
- Williamson, Audrey (1953). Gilbert and Sullivan Opera. London: Marion Boyars. ISBN 0-7145-2766-1.
