= Bumboat =

Small boat used to ferry supplies to ships moored away from the shore

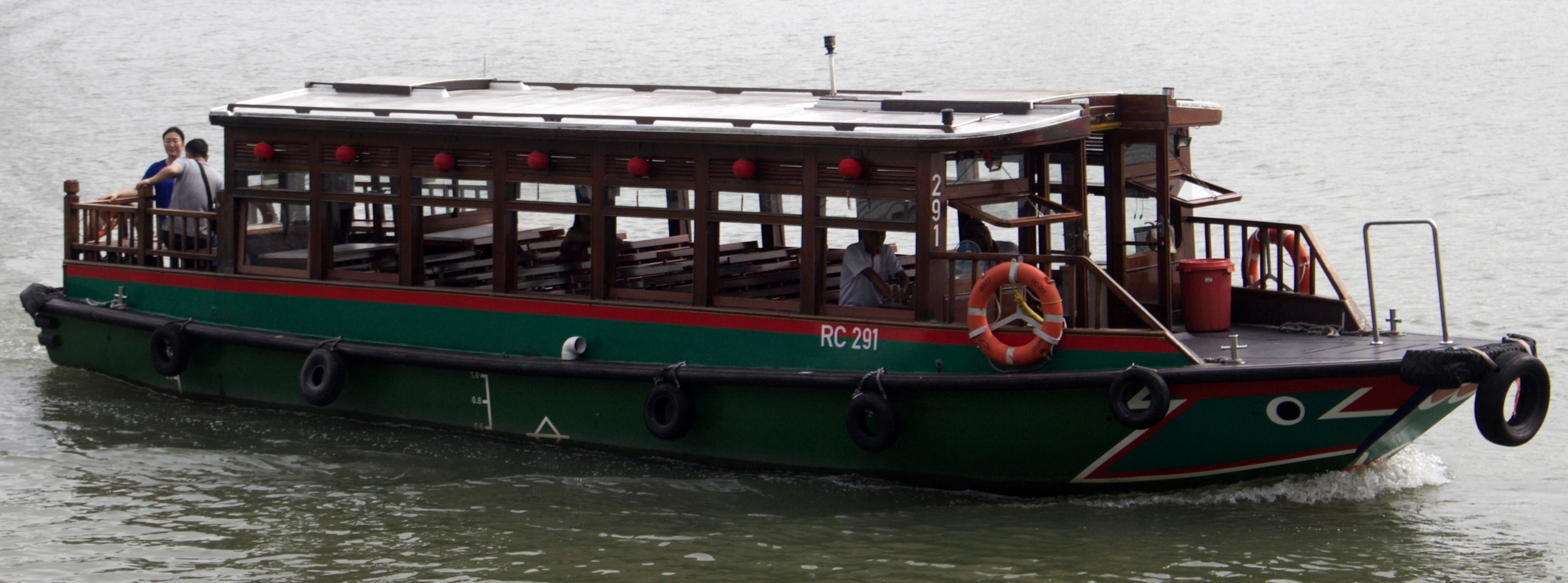
Tourist-oriented bumboats on the Singapore River

A bumboat is a small boat used to ferry supplies to ships moored away from the shore. The name comes from the combination of the Dutch word for a canoe—"boomschuit" ("boom" meaning "tree"), and "boat".

In Tobias Smollett's 1748 novel, The Adventures of Roderick Random, a "bumboat woman" conducts business with sailors imprisoned on board a pressing tender moored near the Tower Wharf on the River Thames, London, England. In HMS Pinafore, W. S. Gilbert describes Little Buttercup as a Bumboat Woman.

In Singapore, the term "bumboat" is applied to small water taxis and boats that take tourists on short tours.

== See also ==
- Ship's tender – Boat used to service larger ships
