= Opera a la Carte (US) =

Opera a la Carte is a Los Angeles-based Gilbert and Sullivan professional touring repertory company. It was founded in 1970 by British Gilbert and Sullivan artist Richard Sheldon (1935–2016), who directed its productions as closely as possible to the style and practice of the original productions of the Savoy operas by the D'Oyly Carte Opera Company. Sheldon retired from Opera a la Carte in 2014. The company often presents H.M.S. Pinafore, The Pirates of Penzance and The Mikado.

As of 2016, Opera a la Carte continues to tour in the United States presenting its "traditional" style Gilbert and Sullivan productions.
