= George P. Carey =

Australian actor and manager

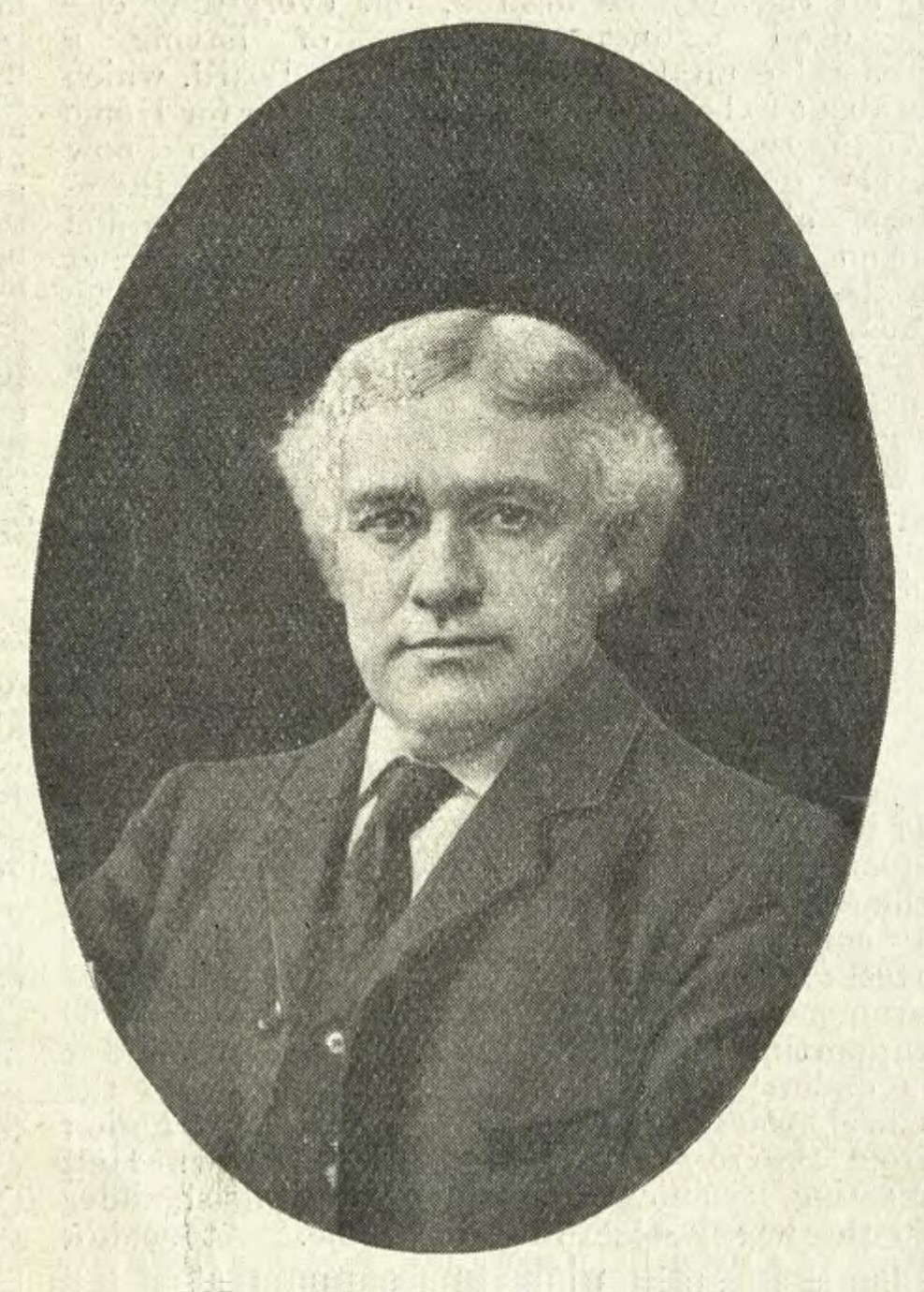
- Portrait of George P. Carey (published in The Bulletin, April 1909).
- Born: George Paul Carey; June 1852; California, U.S.A.
- Died: 28 April 1909 (aged 56); St Vincent's Hospital, Sydney, New South Wales, Australia
- Occupations: actor; stage manager
- Spouse: Mary Arethusa ('May') Hill

George Paul Carey (June 1852 – 28 April 1909) was an Australian actor and manager.

== History ==
Carey was born in California to parents who were married in East Maitland, New South Wales, then, according to Carey's account, returned to Australia in 1855 on the same ship as the Backus Minstrels, (Note: Barque Audubon, 531 tons, Captain Arthur, left San Francisco via Honolulu 9 August 1855, arrived Sydney 23 October 1855. 24 cabin passengers, including Charles Backus (1831–1883), named here; steerage passengers excepted. A secretive lone passenger turned out to be a principal of the insolvent firm of Adams & Co.) then lived at Morpeth on the banks of the Hunter River. At age 10 he was sent to the Fort Street School. His working life began at P. N. Russell's foundry and engineering works at Pyrmont, where in 1870 the future Premier of New South Wales, J. S. T. McGowen (1855–1922), began his apprenticeship, and where fellow-employee W. J. Holloway stimulated his interest in the stage. Carey founded Maitland's Prince Alfred Amateur Dramatic Club before 1868.

His professional career began in 1869 with a bit part in the first Australian production of Dion Boucicault's play Formosa under Dind and Hoskins at the Prince of Wales' Theatre. Players included Hosklns, James J. Bartlett, Charles Young, Charles Burford, H. N. Douglas, the comedian W. A. Andrews (c. 1836 – 28 September 1878), J. J. Welch, W. J. Holloway, Eleanor Carey, Florence Colville, and Kate Corcoran. He was unemployed for some time before being offered a role in "The Five Richards" at the Royal Adelphi, under the management of Rosa Cooper in July 1870. In this burlesque the title role of Shakespeare's Richard III was played by five different actors, one for each act: Dick Roberts (father of Harry R. Roberts), Lionel Harding, Welch, Edmund Holloway, and Andrews. Cooper, who played Queen Elizabeth, called on the talents of W. J. Wilson and A. C. Habbe as scenic artists. The experiment was panned by the critics.

He worked for a time at the Victoria Theatre, Newcastle, in a production that folded and for which he was never paid. In 1871 he was employed by W. J. Holloway to play comic parts in a season of Shakespeare plays in Hobart starring William Creswick and Ada Ward. Next came Adelaide, where he played for Lazar and Allison, as principal comedian, then back to Melbourne, where he was engaged by G. B. Lewis at the Bijou for two years as comic support for Creswick (again), and other visiting "stars", including Wybert Reeve and Fred Marshall, famous for playing "Quilp" in The Old Curiosity Shop.

He went to India with Louise Pomeroy, acting as her stage manager and playing Shakespeare, then to London, where he played Tom Gardham in Youth (by Augustus Harris and Paul Meritt) with the Drury Lane Company.

He returned to Melbourne in 1885, playing Youth with George Rignold, at the Opera House, then raised a touring company of his own. In 1886 he played at Sydney's Opera House, at that time leased by Majeroni and Wilson, whose company comprised John L. Hall, H. N. Douglas, Walter E. Baker, and Docy Mainwaring. He joined Searelle and Harding's Opera Company in 1886 for a Queensland tour, with John L. Hall to New Zealand, and back to Australia to play in The Miner's Daughter, an adaptation of a Bret Harte novel, with Carrie Swain as "Mab". He played "Triplet" to Emily Melville's Peg Woffington in Masks and Faces, and toured Jim the Penman with David Christie Murray and Harry St Maur. In the early 1890s he joined Jennie Lee, playing D. C. Murray's Gratitude and Neil Burgess's County Fair through New Zealand, and on to Sydney, and Melbourne.

In 1899, with the approval of Robert Brough, he took three of his best pieces, Paulton's Niobe, Grundy's A Village Priest and Pinero's The Second Mrs Tanqueray on a tour of inland New South Wales. Included in his troupe were Miss May Hill and Mrs Walter Hill (his wife and mother-in law) and his second son Harold as treasurer. Carey and Harry Plimmer then took those plays to Tasmania.

For 40 years he was seldom out of work, appearing in everything from pantomime and vaudeville to Shakespeare, with the likes of Robert Brough, Simon Lazar, Eduardo Majeroni, G. B. W. Lewis, and W. J. Wilson. He was particularly known for "old man" parts, playing Hardcastle, in She Stoops to Conquer at the Criterion and Briskett in F. Thorpe Tracey and Ivan Berlin's Queen of the Night at the Palace Theatre, Sydney in his last year, before dying aged 57 at St Vincent's Hospital. His remains were interred in the Roman Catholic section of the Waverley Cemetery.

His son George Reginald Carey, invariably referred to as "Redge Carey", was well-known as a character actor and for 25 years producer for J. C. Williamson's. In later years he was a prominent producer in amateur theatre, and ran a repository for stage properties. He was best known for his portrayal of Billy to Cuyler Hastings' Sherlock Holmes in the 1902 theatre production. He was a frequent and welcome visitor to New Zealand.

== Family ==
Carey married May Hill, daughter of Walter Hill (c. 1827 – 21 June 1879) and Julia, Mrs Walter Hill (died 30 November 1919).

- George Reginald "Redge" Carey (9 July 1886 – 24 March 1940), married Eileen Aurora McLennan on 12 May 1921, divorced 1930.
- Harold Carey

May's eldest sister Lily married comic actor "Jack" J. J. Kennedy (April 1857 – 22 May 1896), who began his career with Carey around 1882. On 22 March 1893, May Hill's youngest sister Bessie married Orlando Burbank, a chief mourner at Carey's funeral. (Note: Not to be confused with Otto N. Burbank (died 18 February 1882), a member of Charles Backus' Minstrels, passengers on Audubon on which the Carey family reportedly returned to Australia in 1855.) Their brother Henry Maurice "Harry" Hill (c. 1865 – 10 July 1927) was an actor, elocutionist and drama teacher.
