= W. J. Wilson =

British actor and theatre scenery painter

William John Wilson (24 December 1833 (Note: Several obituaries put his age at 70 but one guessed at 76) – 21 June 1909) was a British actor and theatre scenery painter, who had a career in Australia that included theatre management.

== History ==
Wilson was born in London to an artistic family with Scottish roots. His grandfather John H. "Jock" Wilson was a scene painter at Astley's Amphitheatre, having followed David Roberts and Alexander Nasmyth to London, and his father William Anthony Wilson (c. 1814 – 7 February 1873) was in the same line of work, and an uncle John "Young Jock" Wilson was a landscape and marine painter. Wilson early showed artistic talent, and by the age of 11 was helping out in the paint room of Edinburgh's old Theatre Royal where his father was working for William Murray. And it was there, in pantomime, that Wilson made his first stage appearance. He exhibited paintings at the Society of British Artists when quite young and at the Royal Academy, though not, according to later researchers, at the early age suggested.

=== Victoria ===
Wilson arrived in Melbourne aboard Ivanhoe on 6 March 1855 and was promptly hired as an assistant by William Pitt of George Coppin's company, having been recommended by Fanny Cathcart (who later married Robert Heir and later still to George Darrell). Coppin was at the time managing Melbourne's only playhouse, the Queen's Theatre. (Note: The theatre, in Queen Street, was built for councillor, later mayor, John Thomas Smith, who was also licensee of the adjoining St. John's Tavern.) G. V. Brooke was under contract to Coppin at the time, along with Richard Younge and Fanny Cathcart. While the company was in Geelong, and Madame Carandini was rehearsing The Daughter of the Regiment (she was playing there in April 1855), he lost the sight of his left eye through a bayonet accident.

One reference reports that this loss was permanent and that only through the attention of one Dr Jacob of Melbourne was the other eye saved.

This incident, a critical event in anyone's life, has not been averted to in any of the other obituaries, and a more recent biography reports his recovery in a few months.

Wilson was also known as a character actor, and was in 1855 a founding member of Melbourne's Garrick Club. An early part in Melbourne was as Robin Wildbriar, in Extremes (or) Men of the Day, a comedy by Edmund Falconer. Other roles for which he was known include:

- Snorkey, in Under the Gaslight, Augustin Daly's first success
- Peckover in The Contested Election of Tom Taylor
- Zekiel Homespun in The Heir at Law of George Colman
- Stephen Haresby in The Poor Gentleman (also Colman)
- Modus in The Hunchback by J. S. Knowles
- both Beauséant and Glavis in Bulwer-Lytton's The Lady of Lyons

Sets painted in March 1859 for Boucicault's The Knight of Arva at the Theatre Royal by Wilson and the Danish artist A. C. Habbe (with whom he later had a formal partnership) were praised, as was the work of Pitt, Habbe and Wilson for James Planché's Yellow Dwarf at that venue a month later.

Starting at the Cremorne Gardens at Richmond, he toured Victoria with a panorama of his own design and construction, depicting the Crimean War, with a working model of Siege of Sebastopol complete with fireworks.

=== New South Wales ===
In June 1861 he moved to Sydney, painting sets for Raphael Tolano at the Lyceum in York Street, later known as Queen's Theatre. In September 1861 he was employed on "the grand spectacle in four acts", by Henry Laurent and Edward Fitzball, based on Daniel Auber's L'enfant prodigue, Azael, the Prodigal Son, a production of which he had helped his father paint years before, at the Theatre Royal, Drury Lane. In November 1862 he was secured by William Dind to provide the scenery for the first Australian production of Falconer's Peep o' Day at the Royal Victoria.

In 1863 Wilson and Habbe were employed in decorating the Prince of Wales Theatre, newly rebuilt after the fire of October 1860. Their work included the ceiling and proscenium, and also the act-drop. Wilson suffered severely when he fell from 25 feet (7.6 m) above the stage, but was back at work by December. The theatre, later renamed the Theatre Royal, was opened by W. S. Lyster's opera company. The sets Wilson and Habbe painted for the operas Faust and Oberon in 1865 at the Prince of Wales were much admired.

Wilson had another outlet for his art, portraiture backdrops for photographic studios. In late 1866 he opened his own studio at 267 Pitt Street.

In 1867 these "brothers of the brush" were back at the Lyceum, helping to transform it into the Alexandra Hall, a meeting hall and salon de danse.

In June 1867 he took up a six-month contract in Hokitika, New Zealand which was extended by another six months, his wife and family joining him.

The entrepreneurial phase of his life began on his return to Sydney. In November 1869 Wilson and Habbe joined with Lionel Harding (Note: Lionel Harding, real name William Lionel Man (1832 – 30 March 1904), born in Halstead, Kent, and married Rosa Cooper (1829 – 4 September 1877) The best known member of this family is James Man, whose firm for a time sponsored the Booker Prize.) and his wife Rosa Cooper, to manage the Theatre Royal Adelphi, (yet another name for what became the Queen's Theatre). Harding was praised for providing quality entertainment at a reasonable admission price, and at every performance the scenery artists were applauded vigorously. Two of their "stars" at this time were Daniel Bandmann and his wife Miss Milly Palmer.

In August 1870 the three-way partnership of Harding, Habbe and Wilson was dissolved and Wilson and Habbe opened the Victoria Theatre, in Pitt Street, with the Gregory Troupe, followed in September 1870 with a season starring Mary Gladstane, first in the title role of Frou-Frou, and in October staged Elizabeth, Queen of England, (Note: Thomas Williams's adaptation of Giacometti's Elisabetha regina d'Inghilterra) when Alfred, Duke of Edinburgh attended the theatre.

In 1871 the Habbe-Wilson partnership was forced to declare insolvency, as was Habbe personally. The Hardings returned to England around 1876 and Rosa Cooper (Mrs. Harding), who had been suffering poor health, died around 1877.

In 1873 Wilson was back at the Queen's Theatre, painting sets for W. B. Gill.

In 1874 be joined Edmund Holloway and Lachlan McGowan in a lease of the Queen's Theatre.

In 1876 he was painting scenes at the new Theatre Royal.

In 1877 he was painting sets for C. Wheatleigh at the same Queen's Theatre in 1877.

He painted for Mrs Scott-Siddons’ season in 1878. The sets for her Midsummer Night’s Dream and Uncle Tom’s Cabin were applauded by both critics and patrons.

He is reported as touring New Zealand with Scott-Siddons around 1880, but no corroboration has been found. The eminent actress had a successful tour of New Zealand in early 1877, when Wilson was otherwise engaged.

In September 1880 Kelly and Leon's Opera House on King Street reopened as the Sydney Opera House (no connection to today's famous building on Bennelong Point) and Wilson took over as manager. In 1884 Eduardo Majeroni became co-manager, and together they also managed the Bijou Theatre in Melbourne (Note: Around the time the Majeroni company was leasing the Bijou Theatre, ownership changed to (the unrelated) John Alfred Wilson (c. 1832 – 23 September 1915).) and White's Rooms in Adelaide. They brought out to Australia Wybert Reeve, Emelie Melville, the Wallace-Dunning Opera Company, the Marie de Grey Company, and Minnie Palmer, and were highly successful.

In December 1890 he joined with Fred Hiscocks managing the newly-built Garrick Theatre, later the Tivoli Theatre. Their first production was Moths, Henry Hamilton's adaptation of the Ouida novel, introducing Olga Nethersole and Charles Cartwright to Sydney audiences. The Garrick Theatre failed to gain popular approval for reasons which are not clear, and the entrepreneurs made considerable losses.

In 1892, following a period of financial stress, he advertised for sale some 36 paintings from his travels. In January 1894, a month after the death of his eldest son by consumption, he completed a large and detailed painting of Sydney Harbour, which he offered for sale.

=== Last days ===
Wilson died at his residence of 34 years, "Roseville", 151 Dowling Street, East Sydney, from bronchitis, after a few days illness.

=== Family ===
Wilson married (though not until 1886) Annette Marian Roberts (1841 – August 1924); their family included:

- Blanche Clara Annette Wilson (9 November 1861 – 22 February 1940)
- William Alfred "Willie" Wilson (1864 – 12 December 1893)
- Francis Hawthorne Anthony Wilson, stage name Frank Hawthorne (21 May 1869 – 30 October 1946) born in Dunedin, New Zealand, actor, stage comedian
- Ernest Carden Wilson (13 Feb 1873 – 15 August 1911) married Eva Isabel Farran in 1895. She divorced him in 1902 on grounds of desertion. He was a stage comedian, partnered by his second wife Pearl Hellmrich.

In 1874 the family moved from Palmer Street to 559 George Street South, the following year to "Roseville", 151 Dowling Street, Sydney.
