= Eleanor Carey (actress) =

American actress

Eleanor Carey (1852 – 1 May 1915) was a stage actress in Australia and America.

== History ==
Carey was born in Chile.

Her theatrical career began in August 1868 under William Hoskins at the Prince of Wales Theatre, Sydney, as Mrs Shelborne in the comedy A Roland for an Oliver, and rapidly became popular.

In December 1869 she was the subject of a story that appeared verbatim in all the Melbourne newspapers, to the effect that she had eloped from the "Prince of Wales" with her lover of three years rather than be conscripted into Walter Montgomery's troupe headed for Auckland, New Zealand. There was no mention of the story in the Sydney papers, apart to say that her part (as "Miss Burroughs") in Dion Boucicault's play Formosa, had been taken by another actress. There was no follow-up to the story, and the subject appears not to have been referred to again by any newspaper. Her next stage appearance was a week later, at the Theatre Royal Adelphi, in The Sergeant's Wife, directed by Rosa Cooper.

She appeared in pantomime as Robin Hood

She returned to the Theatre Royal, Melbourne, in May 1876, and played Lady Macbeth to Henry Talbot's Macbeth in June. She played Naomi Tighe in School and Polly Eccles in Caste, both by T. W. Robertson later that month. Carey and her mother left for San Francisco later that year to seek their fortune in America.

In 1889, as Eleanor Corey-Blood, she toured America with the Cora Tanner company.

== Personal ==
Carey married one Livingstone, a banker from an old New York family; they divorced, and on 4 January 1887 in New York she married actor William F. Blande (born William F. Blood) [or vice versa?], and promptly left for a tour of England.
