= Edmund Holloway =

Australian actor

Edmund Holloway (c. 1820 – 18 August 1906) was an Australian actor.

== History ==
Edmund "Old Ned" Holloway was born in Hull, England, and came out to Australia as a sailor "jumping ship" at Hobart. He worked on the Melbourne stage for some years before his first appearance in Sydney as Pythias to James Stark's Damon in 1853. In later years he played supporting roles to such stars as G. V. Brooke and Charles Kean. Perhaps owing something to his years before the mast, he would later play nautical parts with conviction. He had a fine deep voice, and was a popular "Raimondo" in Lucia di Lammermoor.

He was in partnership with George Coppin turning an old brewery in Geelong into a theatre. He tried his hand as stage manager, and was well respected by actors but had little success as a promoter and was forced to declare himself insolvent in 1861.

In 1865 he teamed up with Lachlan McGowan (full name Lachlan McGowan Todd) and Freyberger as lessees of the Theatre Royal, Ballarat, enjoying some success until mid-1869, when they began losing money and were obliged to file for insolvency.

In 1870 Mr and Mrs Holloway toured New Zealand. before playing Augustin Daly's Under the Gaslight at the Adelphi.

In 1874 he leased the Queen's Theatre, Sydney where the couple played Palgrave Simpson's Broken Ties to good houses, the first appearance for both actors in three years.

In 1875–76 he teamed up with McGowan as lessees of the Theatre Royal, Newcastle in opposition to George P. Carey at the Victoria. Later that same year they leased the Olympic Theatre, Maitland, where Frank and Annie Towers played Uncle Tom's Cabin showcasing their precocious daughter Rosa.

From 1878 to 1901 Holloway was closely associated with Alfred Dampier and his Australian Dramatic Company at the Alexandra Theatre, playing Robbery Under Arms, For the Term of His Natural Life (as the hominivorous "Gabbit") and W. J. Lincoln's The Bush King and as Paul Kruger in Briton and Boer (1900).

He died at his residence, "Chowringhie", Garden Street, South Yarra, and was buried at St Kilda. His age was thought to be close to 90. Reckoned the oldest Australian actor still working, his last role was as Dan Moran, Starlight's rival in Robbery Under Arms.

== Personal ==
Holloway married three times. His second wife Elizabeth (c. 1838 – 23 May 1887), whom he married 1870 or earlier, was a fine actress and a most sympathetic person. She was Irish; her remains were buried in the Catholic section of Waverley Cemetery. They had a home at 109 Goulburn Street, Sydney.

He married again, in August 1900, to actress Miss Jennie (or Jenny) Nye. No mention of children has been found.

Holloway was extremely reticent about his age, which associates thought to be "close to 90" when he died. He was not related to William and Charles Holloway, both also well-known actors of the era.
