= Louise Pomeroy =

American actress

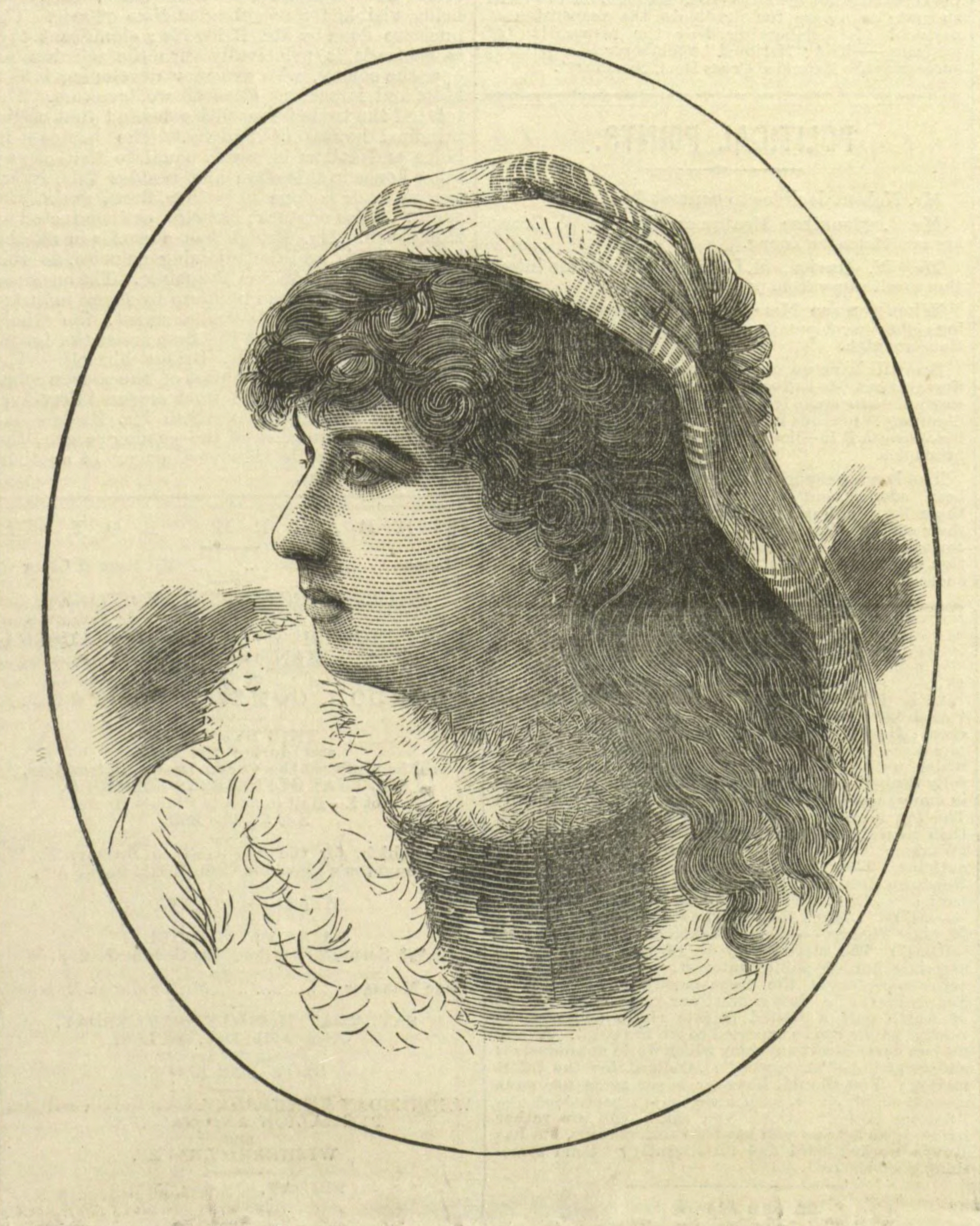
Louise Pomeroy c. 1880

Louise M. Pomeroy née Ryder (c. 1853 – 7 January 1893) was an American actress and writer who was popular in Shakespearean roles in Australia.

Pomeroy was born in Cleveland, Ohio, a daughter of Col. Ryder, a lawyer and judge. Her father's family was of Scottish descent and her mother's of German. At a young age she was married to a Frank Thomas, and after his death she went on the stage. On 15 May 1871 she was married to newspaper owner Mark M. "Brick" Pomeroy, with whom she had a daughter, Louise Rider Pomeroy. Under the pen name "Elm Orlou" she edited a section of her husband's Democrat and wrote essays which were widely reproduced. Her husband objected to her stage ambitions and they separated: he remarried in 1876. (Note: Mark Pomeroy was married to his third wife in September 1876, but his divorce with Louise was finalized in August 1877.) She had been an amateur actor before, as a pupil of J. B. Roberts, and made her professional debut as Juliet on 16 October 1876 at the Lyceum Theatre, New York. She developed a reputation for Shakespearean heroines: Rosalind in As You Like It, Juliet in Romeo and Juliet, Imogene in Cymbeline, and Viola in Twelfth Night.

She was brought out to Australia by Alan Hayman with great expectations, which were fully realised. Her first appearance was at the Queen's Theatre, Sydney, from 7 October 1880 playing on successive nights Rosalind, Lady Macbeth and Juliet. She played Juliet in Melbourne's Theatre Royal to T. C. Appleton's middle-aged Romeo, but his distant performance was overlooked by the audience in their appreciation for Pomeroy. Such was her popularity that they flocked to see her in the rarely-played Cymbeline and A Winter's Tale. in which she played both Hermione and Perdita to an enthusiastic audience. She also drew rave reviews for her impersonation of the "doleful Dane", Prince Hamlet. (Note: Other actresses who notably played Hamlet were Sarah Bernhardt, Charlotte Crampton, Winetta Montague, Rose Edouin (Mrs. G. B. W. Lewis), Charlotte Charke, and more recently Frances de la Tour.)

In 1882 Pomeroy formed a company to tour country towns in Victoria and Queensland. Members included W. J. Holloway and Mrs Holloway, G. P. Carey and Miss Dolly Forde (Mrs Carey), Arthur Elliott ("an actor of considerable promise") who played Romeo to her Juliet, Edwin Palmer, R. A. Vernon, Misses Blanche Louis and Florence Louis. From these she organised a small but efficient company to tour India, playing first at the Corinthian Theatre, Calcutta (now Kolkata) on 1 December.

Elliott and Pomeroy were married at Bendigo, Victoria, on July 30, 1833. They moved to the US in 1884, and were soon in high demand. She died of pneumonia in New York City on January 7, 1893, aged 40.
