= W. J. Holloway =

Australian actor and stage manager

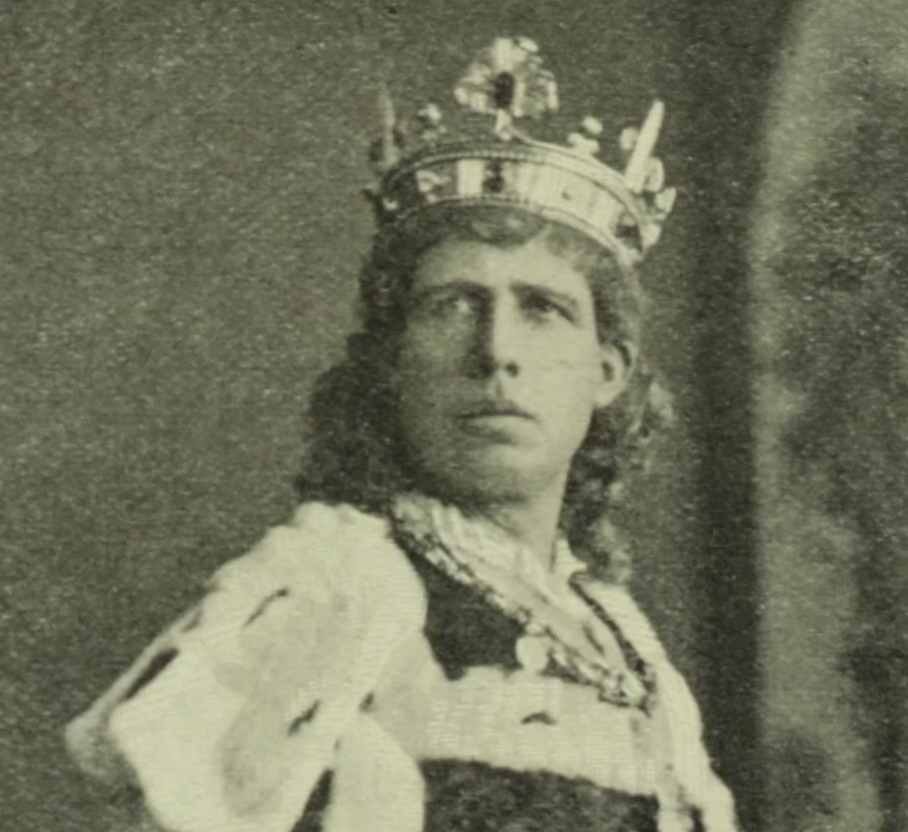
- "W. J. Holloway in a monarchial role" (detail from a photograph by Richards & Co., Ballarat).
- Born: William James Holloway; 4 February 1843; Westminster, London, England
- Died: 7 April 1913 (aged 70); Clapham Common, London, England
- Occupations: actor; stage manager
- Spouse(s): (1) Maria McKewen (2) Emily Ann Morse
- Parent(s): William Michael Holloway & Emma (née Symonds)

William James Holloway (4 February 1843 – 7 April 1913), known professionally as W. J. Holloway, was an Australian actor and stage manager who after some successes moved to London, from where he made several tours of South Africa. He married twice; and recognising the talent of his second wife's daughter, developed it to the full and drove her, as Essie Jenyns, to fame and exhaustion. He also made competent actors of his own children; he was an excellent teacher.

== History ==
William John Holloway was born on 4 February 1843 at Westminster in London, the eldest child of William Michael Holloway and Emma (née Symonds). In 1856 the family emigrated to Australia aboard the vessel Edward Oliver, but Holloway's mother died during the voyage. The ship arrived in Sydney in November 1956.

Holloway began his working life as a boilermaker in the late 1850s at the iron foundry of P. N. Russell and Co. at Pyrmont, where in 1870 the future Premier of New South Wales, J. S. T. McGowen (1855–1922), began his apprenticeship, according to one report, under Holloway's direction. Another notable apprentice, who attributed his love of the stage to Holloway, was George P. Carey.

His theatrical career began in 1862 with the Redfern Amateur Dramatic Club. Fifty years later a correspondent to the Sydney Morning Herald recounted how they staged the Eugene Aram story with Holloway in the name part, also reciting Thomas Hood's The Dream of Eugene Aram. In 1863 he married Maria McKewen, an actress about whom little has been found. They would have four children (see below).

He made what may have been his first professional appearance in Brisbane in the 1866 pantomime season and in March 1867 starred at the Royal Alexandra Theatre, Brisbane in Eugene Aram or The Spectre of St Robert's Cave, featuring the Pepper's ghost illusion. Mrs Holloway was on the bill playing Madeline Lester. It is unlikely that either this or the Redfern production had anything to do with the W. G. Wills drama. A review of his benefit performance damned him with faint praise. When he left Brisbane in March 1868 a review of his farewell benefit was sympathetic. (Note: References to actors Mr & Mrs Holloway in his period can be confusing. The unrelated Edmund Holloway and his wife were leading touring companies in eastern Australia around the same time, and occasionally with the same "stars" (e.g. William Creswick)) He joined the corps dramatique of Sydney's Victoria Theatre in 1869; his first billing was with Marie Duret in Lucretia Borgia for Rosa Cooper.

By 1872 Holloway had assembled a touring company, whose members included "Miss Kate Arden". In 1877 he married Arden, whose real name was Elizabeth Jennings, a widow since 1871. Her daughter Elizabeth Esther Jennings (5 October 1864 – 6 August 1920) would become the actress "Essie Jenyns", acclaimed as the finest Shakespearian actress Australia had produced.

Holloway leased the Theatre Royal (Hobart) and assembled a "Star Dramatic Company" in 1878–9 to support William Creswick and Helen Ashton, playing Sheridan Knowles' Virginius and The Hunchback and several Shakespeare classics. Its members included his brother Charles Holloway.

Essie made her first stage appearance with the Holloway company in Augustin Daly's Leah the Forsaken in 1879, but Holloway wisely refrained from exposing the wunderkind prematurely.

=== England ===
They took a holiday in London 1884–5, during which time Essie Jenyns immersed herself in the work of Sarah Bernhardt, Ellen Terry, Mary Anderson and other great English (and American) actresses.

=== Australia ===
They returned to Australia with a hectic touring schedule, playing Frank Harvey's A Mad Marriage at the Academy of Music, Ballarat in January 1886, and in February the same author's The Ring of Iron at the newly opened Academy of Music in Launceston, to excellent reviews: play, cast (notably Essie Jenyns, in her first professional appearance in Tasmania), and the theatre itself.

When they returned to the Opera House, Sydney however, The Ring of Iron was described by one reviewer as a "tawdry melodrama" which was "soon withdrawn" in favor of Mrs G. W. Lovell's Ingomar the Barbarian, with Holloway in the title role and his wife as Aetoea, a part she knew from her early days with the company.

It was however Jenyns as Parthenia that the audience paid to see, and the show ran for 14 weeks, followed by 16 weeks at the Criterion and 14 at the Melbourne Opera House. They flocked to see her as Juliet, though Holloway was ridiculous as Romeo; she played Viola in Twelfth Night to Arthur Greenaway's Sebastian and Holloway's Malvolio. She played Portia to Holloway's Shylock in The Merchant of Venice. Between October 1886, and October 1888, she appeared in Sydney for three seasons of 14 weeks, 16 weeks, and 4 weeks, and two in Melbourne of 14 weeks and 8 weeks, after which Holloway began making plans for a tour of Great Britain, but she announced her forthcoming marriage and intention to leave the stage and all bets were off. Holloway and his wife left Melbourne for London by SS Mogul on 7 November 1888, ostensibly for a holiday, leaving the company in the hands of his brother Charles (1848–1908) and never returned. Ever the journeyman actor, Charles joined Bland Holt and secured a reputation as an intelligent interpreter of supporting roles. Essie Jenyns married brewery heir John Robert Wood on 5 December 1888 and left the stage for good.

=== England again ===
Made quite wealthy by the successes of the previous year, the Holloways settled in England in April 1889, and purchased a property, "Waratah", near London. Holloway returned to the stage in 1892 for a role in King Lear at the Lyceum, and took over the title role at three hours' notice when (shortly to become Sir) Henry Irving was indisposed through illness. He was well received by press and public, and appeared in the part for several weeks with Ellen Terry and the Lyceum cast, then during Irving's convalescence the two artists alternated. He became manager of Terry's Theatre in 1894, playing Edward Moore's The Foundling.

They made three tours to South Africa with a company that included his wife, his son W. D. Holloway, and his two daughters Juliet and Theodora. In the first they arrived at the time of the Jameson Raid (1895–6). In 1898 they toured The Sign of the Cross throughout the country; also appearing as Richard III, Richelieu, Hamlet, etc. In the third tour, 1905, playing The Prisoner of Zenda and The Three Musketeers.

Between these highly lucrative tours, he was involved with productions in London: the farce A Day in Paris at the Duke of York's Theatre in 1895.

In his later years Holloway maintained an interest in the stage. He died on 7 April 1913 at Clapham Common, London, aged 70 years.

== Family ==
William James Holloway married Maria McKewen (c. 1842 – 5 December 1876) on 24 January 1863. Their children include:

- William Henry Holloway (23 May 1864 – 23 August 1925), commercial traveller, of "Mascotte," Colin Street, North Sydney married Caroline Fredericka Sasse (28 January 1862 – 27 April 1914), daughter of Richard Bourke (Burck?) Sasse.
- Theodora Victoria Anne Holloway (25 December 1874 – 15 May 1946) wrote The Laird o' Rossmere published (1894) in Hobart. She married Dr William John Robertson (died 14 December 1948) of London on 31 January 1901.
- Juliet Cora Siddons Holloway (1876 – 14 November 1933) married

1. Dr William Walter Stoney (1870 – 17 February 1915) of Johannesburg and had 3 children.
2. Edward Dymoke Pennington (c. 1892–1927) in 1918 and had one daughter Juliet Dymoke Pennington.

- William Edwyn Crowther Holloway (1879–1952) married Gladys Margaret Boyd Schleselman in 1913, lived in London.

He married again in 1877, to Emily Jennings, née Morse or Moss, stage name "Kate Arden", widow of Charles Jennings (died 1871), pharmacist.

- He adopted her daughter Elizabeth Esther Helen Jennings (1864 – 6 August 1920), stage name "Essie Jenyns". She married John Robert Wood (1865–1928), only son of the brewer John Wood (died 6 September 1887) on 5 December 1888, at St Andrew's (Anglican) Cathedral, Sydney, a ceremony that ended in a full-scale riot.

His brother Charles Holloway (1848 – 29 November 1908) married actress Alice Victoria Hayward "Alice Deorwyn". They had one daughter:

- Beatrice Denver Holloway (1884–1964) played juvenile leads with them before joining the Fred Niblo Company; married Robert Greig ("Hives the butler" in Animal Crackers) and moved to Hollywood.

Alice Deorwyn had a sister Constance Deorwyn, who was also an actor.

He had another brother, (Jesse) George Holloway (14 May 1847 – 1928), living in Goulburn, who was present at their brother Charles's funeral.

- Jesse George Wood Holloway (1878–1951 or 1952) born Goulburn, orchardist of Tarlo, near Goulburn, was a son.
