= Frank Harvey (playwright) =

British actor and playwright

Franks Harvey was the nom de plume of John Ainsworth Hilton, born Jean François de Soissons de Latanac (c. April 1842 – 29 March 1903), actor and playwright, who was born and died in Manchester, England. His plays were popular in Australia.

He was the father of Australian screenwriter Frank Harvey (1885–1965) and grandfather of the English screenwriter Frank Harvey (1912–1981).

== Selected plays ==
- The Wages of Sin performed by the W. J. Holloway company at the Academy of Music, Ballarat in January 1884
- Woman against Woman, adapted from the French and first staged in March 1883 at the Theatre Royal, Portsmouth
- A Wife's Victory at the Princess's Theatre, Melbourne in August 1884.
- A Mad Marriage performed by the W. J. Holloway company at the Academy of Music, Ballarat in January 1886.
- The Lord of The Rings performed by the W. J. Holloway company at the Academy of Music, Launceston in 1886.
- The World Against Her performed by Alfred Dampier's company at the Victoria Theatre, Newcastle in May 1888. ".. one of the most sympathetic plays ever written"
- Judge Not performed by Alfred Dampier's company at the Alexandra Theatre, Melbourne "... the very essence of dulness and puerility ... difficult to comprehend why a gentleman of Mr. Dampier's experience and ability prefers plays of this class ... Dampier subsequently, and successfully, replaced it with his dramatization of Monte Cristo.
- The Land of the Living performed by Grattan Riggs with the Holloway-Howe company at the Theatre Royal, Hobart in February 1890.
- Fallen Among Thieves performed by the W. J. Holloway company at the Princess Theatre, Bendigo.
- Shall We Forgive Her performed by the W. J. Holloway company at the Maryborough Town Hall.
- A House of Mystery at the Criterion Theatre, Sydney in December 1899.
- The Milestones of Life "... one of the best things Frank Harvey has given the world"
- The World's Mercy Coulter Dramatic Company in Broken Hill, December 1904
- A Musician's Romance at the Theatre Royal, Perth, July 1905
- The Workman's Wife performed by the Dora Mostyn Dramatic Company at Mount Alexander, Victoria in July 1903.
