= Mary Gladstane =

Irish-American actress

Mary Gladstane (born in the 19th-century) was an Irish-American actress of the 19th-century who had a considerable career in Australia, along with her husband and manager, L. M. Bayless.

== History ==
According to one researcher, Gladstane was born Mary Jane Carson, eldest of three actress daughters of Peter Carson, an Irish compositor, and his wife Catherine; married William Cockerill Gladstane, an American solicitor, in 1845. (Note: This contention has been corroborated to some extent: her two actress sisters and British origin, and she had earlier played as Mrs W. C. Gladstane, starring opposite James Edward Murdoch in Bulwer-Lytton's Money, Romeo and Juliet and Wild Oats at the Washington Theater in 1860, and opposite Barry Sullivan in Hamlet at the same theatre in 1859.) Another researcher found Mary Gladstane married L. M. Bayless (Note: Possibly Louis Maclain or Lewis McLean Bayless, but there is scarcely less evidence for "Leon" as his given name.) on 1 June 1868; no further details.

She arrived in Australia with Bayless, as husband and manager, and from 9 July 1870 played Tom Taylor's newly published drama Mary Warner at the Princess Theatre, Melbourne. That was followed by the first Australian production of Paolo Giacometti's Elizabeth, Queen of England at the Princess Theatre, Melbourne on 23 July 1870 and played the queen.

On 10 August 1875 a full production in Italian was presented at the Opera House, Melbourne with Madame Ristori in the title role and Eduardo Majeroni as Robert, Earl of Sussex.

On 6 August 1870 she opened at the Princess Theatre, Melbourne, with Frou-Frou, in a translation by F. Williams, stage-manager of the Boston Museum theatre. On 26 September she opened at the Victoria Theatre, Sydney in the same production. That same night, Mrs Bandmann opened at the Prince of Wales Opera House, Sydney, in the "correct translation" of Frou-Frou by Sutherland Edwards of the Pall Mall Gazette, as performed at the Olympic Theatre, London. One critic found Gladstane, not unnaturally, better settled into the part and on the whole gave the better performance but was over-melodramatic in the final (reconciliation and death) scene; both deserved a better vehicle. Neither production was a great success — Bandmann's folded after four nights and Gladstane's after little more than a week.

In February 1873 after 233 performances in that Melbourne alone, she left Australia, giving farewell performances of Queen Elizabeth, Frou-Frou, Camille, East Lynne and finally Reade and Taylor's Masks and Faces and Boucicault's London Assurance though comedy was not her forté.

In October 1876 Gladstane and Bayless returned to Melbourne after three years working in Great Britain and elsewhere. There were no theatres available for lease so she toured East Lynne and Camille and Morris Barnett's comedy The Serious Family at the Academy of Music, Ballarat and the Mechanics' Institute, Geelong; Lucretia Borgia and Schiller's Mary Stuart, Queen of Scotland at the Royal Princess Theatre, Bendigo and the Theatre Royal, Castlemaine. In 1877 she played the Theatre Royal, Hobart, the Theatre Royal, Launceston, and the Victoria Theatre, Sydney. In September Bayless took leases on both the Queen's Theatre, Sydney and the Princess Theatre, Melbourne, refitting the latter and opening it December 1977 as the New Princess. In November 1879 Gladstane appeared at the Theatre Royal, Melbourne to relive scenes from some of her past triumphs. The one published review was not entirely complimentary and this may have been her last appearance on the Australian, or any, stage.

In June 1880 Bayless leased the Academy of Music, Adelaide, intending to mount a production of Struck Oil, but was frustrated by J. C. Williamson threatening legal action, so substituted performances by Edward McLean's Juvenile Dramatic Troubadors of Milky White and The Two Bailiffs, followed by Pinbehind, F. H. Linklater's burlesque on H.M.S. Pinafore.
Later that year Bayless and John Solomon took over the Guild Hall, on Castlereagh Street, Sydney, which after extensive renovation they renamed the Gaiety Theatre, reopening in December 1880, with Bayless leasing the theatre from Solomon.

Bayless and Gladstane announced they would return to America in June or July 1881, prior to which Mrs Gladstane would reprise some of her triumphs in a brief season. In May 1882 he announced his imminent departure for America to recruit new acts, and recruited Walter Reynolds as a partner. He is reported as being presented by admirers with valuable gifts including a gold ring with three brilliants. He did not leave immediately however, as in April 1883 Bayless and Gladstane took over management of the Gaiety Theatre, and appointed Frank Towers as manager. That relationship was strained over a gas bill, signalling financial failure.

In 1884 Bayless was in California, chasing the comedian Nat C. Godwin for non-fulfilment of his contract. In 1885 Bayless was still in America, in trouble with a debt collector, and was forced to hand over the "gold ring with three brilliants".

Mrs Gladstane's departure may have been later, but by 1887 she had returned to America, living at Long Branch, perhaps Long Branch, New Jersey. Nothing further has been found of either Gladstane or Bayless.

== A tribute ==
The theatre manager Sheridan Corbyn, in a long and informative letter, discussed how top-flight American artists could command much higher fees at home than Australian theatres could afford, hence only those struggling to find work would accept bookings. He mentioned Gladstane as an exception, along with Joseph Jefferson, James Stark, the sisters Zavistowski, Edwin Adams, the Williamsons (J. C. Williamson and Maggie Moore), and Emmet.
