= Essie Jenyns =

Australian actress

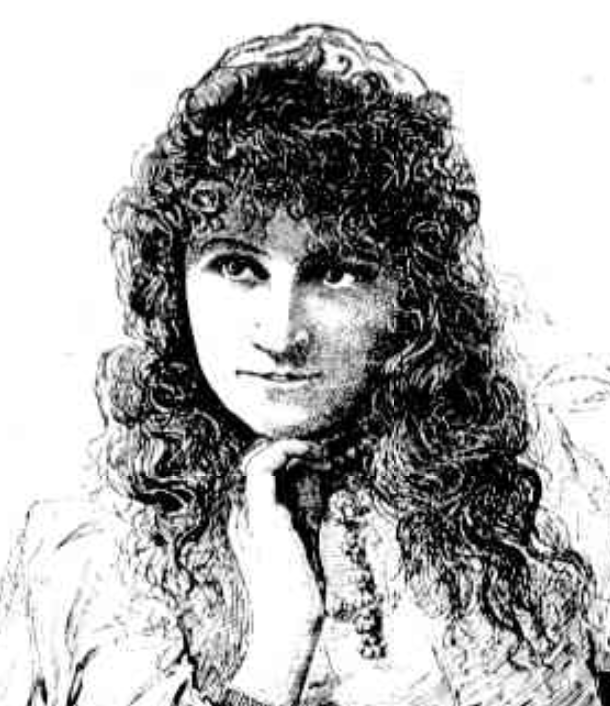
- Born: Elizabeth Esther Helen Jennings; 5 October 1864; Brisbane, Queensland, Australia
- Died: 6 August 1920 (aged 55); Killara, Sydney, New South Wales, Australia
- Other name: Mrs J. R. Wood
- Occupation: actress
- Years active: 1879–1888
- Known for: Shakespearean roles

Essie Jenyns (5 October 1864 – 6 August 1920) was an Australian actress best known for her Shakespearean roles.

== Birth and early life ==
Elizabeth Esther Ellen Jennings was born in Brisbane, Queensland in 1864. Her father, Charles Robert Merevale Jennings, was a chemist who died in 1871 when Jenyns was seven. To support the family, her mother, Emily Ann Jennings née Morse, became an actress in W. J. Holloway's company using the stage name "Kate Arden". In 1877 she married Holloway.

== Career ==
Jenyns began her stage career in Leah, the Forsaken at the Theatre Royal in Hobart in January 1879. Her performance was reviewed as "childlike and natural as little Leah, and gave promise of future success in parts of this description". Next, in After Dark, she "surprised everyone by her natural rendering of Johnny Williams, a 'sidewalk merchant prince'". At age 18 her Ophelia was described in The Bulletin as "a performance full of promise... We shall watch this young lady's career with interest".

In 1884 she went Europe with her mother and step-father where she studied the acting techniques of Sarah Bernhardt, Ellen Terry and Mary Anderson. Returning to Sydney in 1886 the Holloway theatre company opened at the Opera House for a 14-week season with Jenyns in the leading roles and playing to capacity audiences. This was followed by a further 16 weeks at the Criterion Theatre and a 14-week season at the Opera House in Melbourne.

Jenyns received acclaim for performances as Juliet in Romeo and Juliet, Viola in Twelfth Night and Portia in The Merchant of Venice and in other Shakespearean roles.

== Personal ==
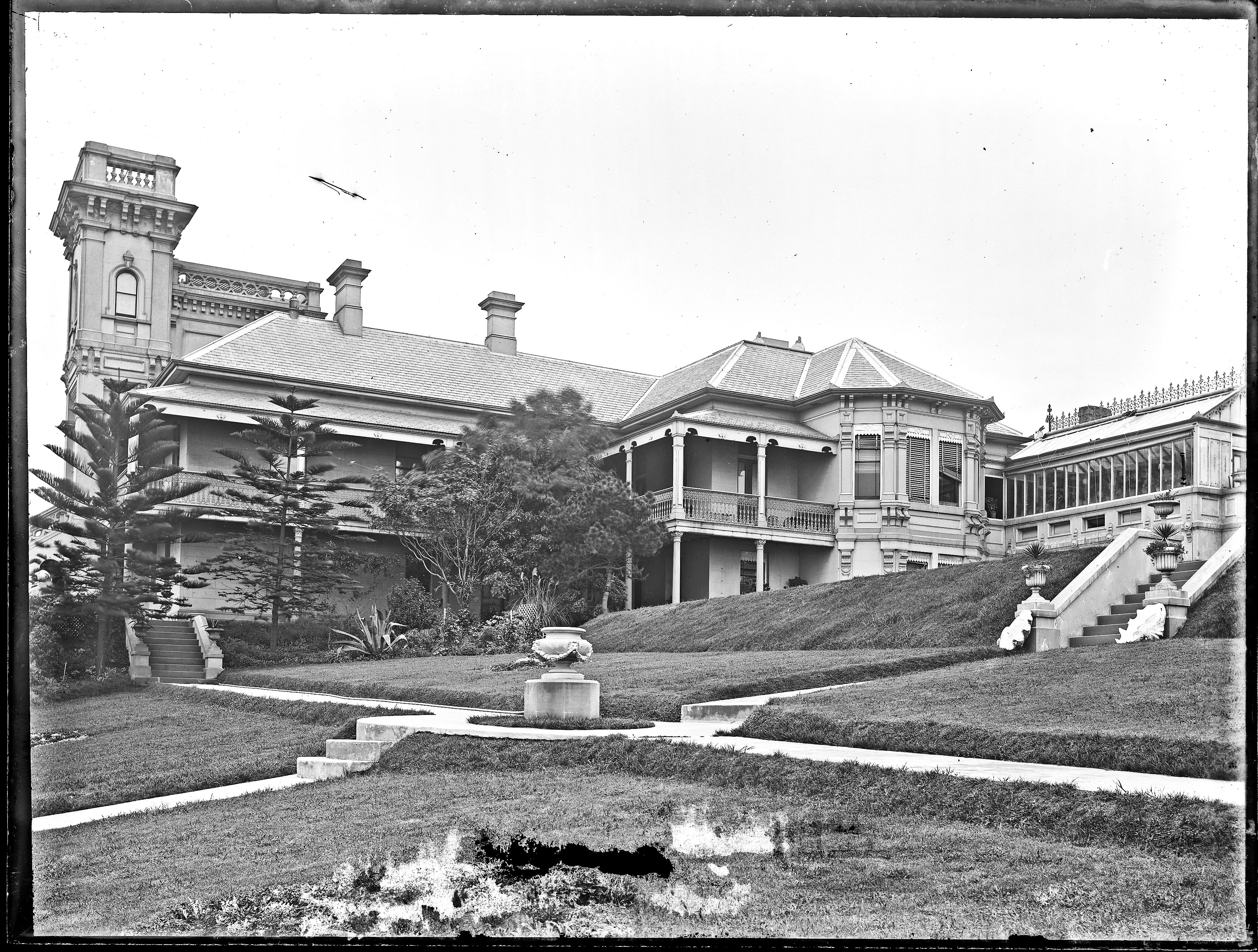
Jesmond House, Newcastle, New South Wales, March 1890

Jenyns married John "Jack" Robert Wood, a wealthy Newcastle brewer and interstate cricketer, at St. Andrew's Cathedral, Sydney on 5 December 1888. The wedding attracted so much attention that tickets were dispensed. However the Cathedral was overrun with press and members of the public and the wedding party had trouble making their way into the church. At the conclusion of the ceremony, a riot broke out and much of the church furniture was damaged or removed as souvenirs and Jenyns was carried out to her carriage in "a fainting condition".

She retired from the stage and initially went to live in Jesmond House, Newcastle with her husband, where they were "well known for their many acts of charity ... founding the first free kindergarten in Newcastle".

The family moved to London, and by 1908 they had a home, "Collington" in Bexhill-on-Sea, where she had the companionship of a pair of Australian Terriers. They later had a home in Putney. Despite efforts to persuade Jenyns to take up acting again, she declined all offers, with the occasional exception of appearing at performances for charities.

While on a short holiday to Australia, Jenyns died in a private hospital in Killara, NSW on 6 August 1920 after an operation. The funeral took place at the Christ Church Cathedral before her burial at Sandgate Cemetery, near Newcastle. She was survived by her husband and two children — Lieut. John Morton Devereux Wood, M.C. and Esther Lyal Wood.
