= Eduardo Majeroni =

Italian musician

Eduardo Majeroni (Note: Also, commonly, "Edoardo" or "Edouardo"; the "Maj" in his surname is pronounced "My".) (1840 – 20 October 1891) was an actor who toured the world with Adelaide Ristori, playing popular Italian dramas in their original language. He and his wife Giulia, a niece of Ristori, left the company in Australia and carved out a career playing the same repertoire in English translations. Giulia was an actress, and their two sons Mario and George had acting careers in America.

== History ==
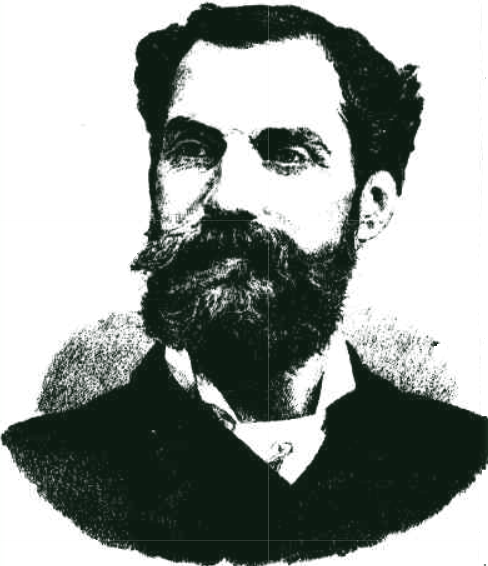
Eduardo Majeroni in 1889

Majeroni was born in Bergamo, the youngest of 17 children, and educated in Milan. His parents had visions of his becoming a civil engineer like his grandfather, who had a hand in building the fortress at Marghera, and enrolled him in a college in Milan. Majeroni however put more effort into the college's theatrical endeavors than course work, and when Count Cavour enlisted Napoleon III's aid to drive out the Austrians in 1859, he and his comrade Alexander Meschini abandoned study for the glamour of an artillery uniform. They saw little fighting; after the siege of Bologna, (Note: In May 1859 Austria ceded the Papal States (which included Bologna) to Napoleon and Cabour, and the "siege" may have been a strategy rather than a confrontation.) which lasted five days before the Austrians capitulated, their capture of succeeding towns resembled nothing so much as a triumphal march, and arrived too late to assist the French at Magenta. With the hateful Armistice of Villafranca signed, Majeroni and Meschini despondently returned to Milan, where they fell in with a crowd of aspiring actors, and was engaged as "utility man" — bit player, stagehand, and poster writer — by an impresario named Pilati, for little reward as it turned out when he left in April 1860. He may have then tried his hand at theatre management, taking a short term lease on a small theatre in Genoa.

It was during this period he was noticed by Madame Ristori, resulting in an engagement with her company, which he joined in December 1860. Two years later he was forced by the irate father of a young actress to leave. He returned to Italy, forming his own company in Genoa, which led to an engagement with the company of one Signor Ajudi or Aiudi, playing the lead role in a classical drama. Again there was a compromising affair, this time with the manager's wife, and he was sacked when the company was in Alexandria. He remained in Egypt, setting himself up as a importer of Italian goods and produce, which proved profitable. In late 1864 he left Alexandria for Naples, where his eldest brother, the famous Achille Majeroni, had formed a company and leased the Teatro Mercadante for a series of plays.

In 1866 war was again declared against Austria, this time with Prussia as an ally, and Majeroni joined Garibaldi's Redshirts. By teaming up with three other volunteers to safeguard each others' interests he survived the war without injury, and was awarded a Medaglia al valor militare for planting il Tricolore at Fort Ampola while under fire. He rejoined his brother's touring company after hostilities ended, then around the end of 1867 returned to Ristori's company, and when Ernesto Rossi left the organisation, became her leading man, acting in every play in the Italian repertory.

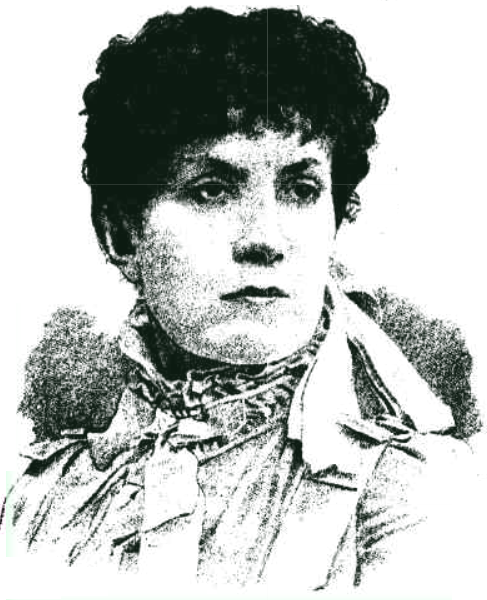
Signora Majeroni, née Giulia Tessero

Around this time Majeroni married Ristori's niece, Giulia Tessero; they had two sons.

His world tour with the Ristori Italian Dramatic Company began at Bordeaux on 5 May 1872 and ended on 4 December 1875 in Adelaide, Australia. It was a triumphant last week and Majeroni, as Holofernes in Judith, was praised to the sky.

=== Australia ===
The company returned to Europe by the RMS China on 5 December 1875, but without Majeroni, who was determined to stay, at least partly to learn the language, as urged by Mapleson.

His next appearance in Australia was under contract to Samuel Lazar, in The Old Corporal, translated from a French play, (Note: Originally Le Caporal et la Payse ou Le vieux Caporal by Dumanoir and Adolphe d'Ennery, written for Frédérick Lemaître and Clarisse Midroy and translation (perhaps from the Italian version) credited to one Enrico Bellotti.) staged at Sydney's Theatre Royal commencing 24 April 1876, and was rapturously received.

The play moved to the Royal Victoria Theatre and was followed by Society, or, A Mistake in Education. (Note: Society, or, A Mistake in Education, presented in Melbourne as Jealousy or Mistaken Education, from Un vizio di educazione (1872) by Achille Montignani (1819–1879), English translation by one François Morel of Melbourne.) on 24 July.

D'Augigny's melodrama Friendship's Triumph, or, The Two Sergeants, translated by John Bushelle of Sydney, concluded the season.

Brisbane followed in September, under the management of H. N. Montagu, better known as the owner of Sydney Punch.

Melbourne followed at the Theatre Royal, Melbourne on 25 November with The Old Corporal, and the Signora alternated with Camille (Note: Camille, a "new and beautiful adaptation" of Dumas fils' novel La Dame aux Camélias.) from 4 December, then they appeared together in Society, renamed Jealousy. A month later, Signora Majeroni gave birth to their second son. They returned to the Melbourne stage in March, this time at the Academy of Music, with a new play, A Living Statue, again translated from the Italian La Statua di Carne of Teobaldo Cicconi, by François Morel. Their final shows in Melbourne consisted of the Ristori favorite Queen Elizabeth, by Giacometti, with the vaudevillean Nephews and Nieces on the same bill, closing on 7 April 1877. They toured Jealousy, A Living Statue, and The Old Corporal for short seasons to the Royal Princess Theatre, Bendigo, the Academy of Music, Ballarat, and the Mechanics' Institute, Geelong several times throughout April and May, before crossing to Tasmania, playing at the Theatre Royal, Hobart to 16 June and the Theatre Royal, Launceston to 28 June, closing with Camille and Nephews and Nieces. Next stop was Adelaide, playing at White's Rooms to 3 August. At every stop they played to full houses and appreciative audiences then across "the ditch" to New Zealand, taking in Christchurch, Dunedin, and Wellington, but takings were poor on account of local actors being used for supporting roles, some said, rather than importing fresh faces. The Majeronis had also lost their hard-working tour manager, Oreste Nobili.

=== America and back ===
The Majeronis had an engagement beginning 2 February 1878 at the California Theatre playing The Old Corporal, but failed dismally and headed east. They appeared at the Fifth Avenue Theater, New York, from 29 April to favorable reviews, Majeroni in Corporal and the pair in Husband and Wife (Jealousy by another name). Camille followed, and both actors were damned with lukewarm praise from at least one critic. They joined Fred Warde's company, playing in Diplomacy, dissatisfied with their treatment, they left the company, which disbanded in Washington in January 1879. Majeroni and his elder son started touring the Southern States under manager E. F. Zimmerman. Majeroni's voice had been failing, attributed to New York's winters, but the warmer climate of Florida did not help. He rejoined his wife briefly, but the northern winter brought on a fresh relapse and he returned to Sydney in August 1882 as manager for American comedian Joseph B. Polk.

With the company disbanded and a young child to feed, Signora Majeroni toured with the Bartlett-Campbell company for two years, but the drudgery of playing the same part every night proved stultifying to the artist who enjoyed nothing more than learning a new part and growing into the character.

George and Julia Adelaide Polk made their Australian debut at the Princess Theatre, Melbourne on 30 September 1882 in a new play, The Strategist by Theo H. Sayre, followed by The American, written for Polk by George H. Jessop. Majeroni's throat affliction improved significantly around this time, and he sent a message to Mrs Majeroni to join him. The Polks opened in Sydney on 15 February 1883 at the Opera House with a locally recruited supporting cast to a packed house. Newcastle followed on 7 April and Brisbane on the 17th and Adelaide 28 May. Signora Majeroni arrived from San Francisco around the end of April, and accompanied her husband to Adelaide. He took over the lease on Melbourne's Bijou Theatre from G. B. W. Lewis, and with Signora Majeroni on 1 September 1883 reprised their roles in Jealousy of six years earlier. In 1884 they joined forces with W. J. Wilson, who was managing the Sydney Opera House (no connection to today's famous building on Bennelong Point), where they put on Camille and Marie Antoinette, both written expressly for Ristori by Paolo Giacometti. and Sardou's Fédora. They took over the leases of Melbourne's Bijou Theatre and White's Rooms in Adelaide, and brought in some attractive performers — Miss De Grey's London Comedy Company, as well as their own Majeroni and Wilson's Comic Opera Company with Luscombe Searelle's Bobadil and much else, but business was slow and they lost money. Majeroni was beset by poor health in his last years. It may be no coincidence that these last productions — Jealousy, Camille and Marie Antoinette were written for a female lead.

They made another tour of India and China in 1889, playing Jealousy at the Corinthian Theatre, Calcutta, to good if refined reviews from The Statesman of India, but were in very poor health on their return to Sydney.

=== Last years ===
On 6 May 1891 Majeroni was tendered a "monster benefit" at Her Majesty's Theatre, but he had become a recluse, and wasted away, dying from consumption at his home, 156 Victoria Street, and his remains were buried at the Waverley Cemetery. The Argus felt the Australian had

. . . lost one of its brightest ornaments, as by this time Australians appear to have regarded Eduardo as an honorary Englishman and he and his family had become an integral part of Australian theatre life. Those who only knew Majeroni from his later years could have no idea of the fire and passion in his voice as Mme Ristori's leading man.

After her husband died, their two sons left for America to seek their fortune; she lost her voice and had to give up the stage. She wrote a novel, A Living Statue, (the title of one of their successes), written in Bathurst and published in 1893.

On 3 December 1895 their friends held a benefit concert at Melbourne's Princess Theatre for Giulia Majeroni, who had fallen on hard times. Though still in the "prime of life" she did not have the drive of her illustrious aunt, and gave up the theatre. She died on 8 August 1903 and her body was transported to Sydney to be buried in the Waverley Cemetery, alongside that of her husband.

=== Giulia Majeroni ===
Back when the Majeronis were at the peak of their popularity in Australia, the Signora related to an interviewer how she came from a dramatic family.

We Italians learn as children to speak with our bodies and our eyes. Our faces talk. We often exchange sentiments, ask and receive, lay plans and make arrangements without uttering a word, and this facility we carry into our stage life. So much so that at rehearsal my companions are accustomed to read a response to what they are saying in my face, and if, to save myself for the evening's work, I adopt English immobility of expression, they stop short, bewildered, although they never expect the same facial answer from those of their own race."

She remembered how, as the young wife of her aunt's "leading man", she joined the company in order to travel with her husband, taking tiny parts such as Marie Lambrun in Queen Elizabeth, and by "speaking with her face" getting favorable reviews. until the company came to value their "small part" artist.

== Recognition ==
in 1876 Paolo Giorza published two compositions, The Giulia Waltz, and The Old Corporal Quadrille, with portraits of the Signora and Signor, respectively, on the covers of the sheet music.

== Publications ==
- Majeroni, Eduardo (1840) La presa di Costantina spettacolo militare diviso in cinque giornate ridotto per le scene da Eduardo Majeroni, A play about the capture of Constantine, Algeria, by the French in 1837.
- Majeroni, Giulia (1893) A living Statue, a novel. George Robertson

== Quote ==
(In 1874 they) immediately established themselves in public favour as artists of the first rank. They were both in the plenitude of their powers, handsome in person, emotional by nature, full of intelligence, with a keen insight into character, picturesque in style, vivid in dramatic portraiture, and animated by an enthusiastic love of their art.

== Family ==
Eduardo Majeroni married Giulia Tessero (c. 1849 – 8 August 1903) c. 1870; they had two sons, both with a film career in America:

- Mario Majeroni (1870–1931) born in Italy
- Giorgio "George" Majeroni (11 January 1877 – 1924) born in Melbourne
