= Theatre Royal, Ballarat =

Theatre in Ballarat, Victoria

The Theatre Royal, Ballarat was a theatre in Ballarat, Victoria. It was the first permanent theatre built in Inland Australia. When the theatre opened in 1858, it was the finest structure in the gold-rich town, and possibly the grandest and most up-to-date theatre in Victoria, outside Melbourne. A series of lessees and managers attracted well-known theatrical companies and artists to its stage, but one by one left disillusioned and none the richer, its periods of inactivity after each entrepreneur growing longer and longer. It declined irretrievably in the 1870s, according to one report due to an infestation of fleas which defied eradication, and piece by piece became a commercial establishment. Historian Ailsa Brackley du Bois attributed the theatre's decline to local activists of the temperance movement who viewed the culture surrounding the theatre as encouraging immoral behavior.

== History ==
Ballarat's first "Theatre Royal", a timber and canvas structure, was operated by Tom Hetherington and his wife at the Gravelpits, opposite Golden Point. He advertised it for sale by auction in March 1854 but must have had no takers, as in November 1854 he offered free entertainment to diggers who had suffered losses in the Eureka disturbance of 17 October. He was forced to close due to the encroaching overburden from the mineshafts.

It was not Ballarat's only theatre. The Crystal Palace Concert-room, Jones and Noble's Circus, Queen's Theatre, Victoria Theatre, Montezuma Theatre (named for Lola Montez), Star Concert Hall, and the Charlie Napier Theatre (an adjunct to the Charlie Napier Hotel), provided entertainment to cashed-up miners.

Ballarat theatre locations 1860–1870
(approx only, from descriptions)
1 Theatre Royal, Sturt Street
2 Charlie Napier Theatre, Main Road

There was agitation in Ballarat for something more permanent, and on 17 April 1858 the western part of the section on the corner of Armstrong and Sturt streets, (between the Clare Hotel (Note: The Clare Hotel, not to be confused with the Limerick and Clare Castle Hotel on Main Road, became the Port Phillip Hotel, William Jackson licensee, in July 1858; later Crawford's drapery, taken over by Snow and Room in 1887 and became known as "Snow's Corner".) and Barker's butcher shop) was assigned by the landowner James Bourchier to the Theatre Royal Company, comprising Thomas Wymond, T. S. Brown, and one other. It would pass through many more hands in the coming decade. Shares in the company were issued, Backhouse and Reynolds engaged as architects, and the foundation stone was laid by G. V. Brooke on 19 January 1858. The audience area (stalls, pit, boxes, and gallery) was 60 by 52 feet (18 m × 16 m), seating 1500, and the stage 38 by 32.5 feet (11.6 m × 9.9 m), equipped with all the latest mechanisms — fly system and trapdoors. The gas fittings, appointments and decorations were judged elaborate and tasteful. The building cost £10,000. William Hoskins was hired as manager.

The grand opening was 27 December 1858, with Douglas Jerrold's five-act comedy Time Works Wonders, starring G. H. Rogers, Kate Howard and Rosa Dunn. On 14 January 1859 fire broke out among the pyrotechnic materials in a storeroom adjoining the stage but, thanks to prompt action by the staff of the Port Phillip Hotel adjacent, was contained.

On 21 March 1859 the acclaimed actor George Coppin, who was also the local MLC, felt obliged to make a personal statement, against criticism from newspapers and (mostly anonymous) private citizens, defending his right to follow both callings; that the occupation of actor was as respectable as any other.

In January 1860 Hoskins became sole lessee and manager, advertising in Melbourne for actors and musicians, offering "liberal treatment" to "stars". He retired as manager a year later and was replaced by Clarance Holt. Later that month the Napier (which Hoskins also leased for a time) and Montezuma theatres, both on Main Road, were destroyed by fire, leaving the "Royal" with little or no competition. The "Café Royal" in the basement also profited by the destruction of the "Café de Paris" at the Charlie Napier. Its manager was Daniel Symons, previously of the "Charlie Napier". By September 1861 Symons was the sole lessee, and did his best to make the theatre profitable. He was granted a licence for the "Theatre Royal Hotel" in June 1863 and within a year had left the Theatre Royal to manage its Melbourne namesake.

Despite the energy and undoubted abilities of Hoskins and Holt, and the talent they brought to the town, the theatre never attracted sufficient custom to turn a profit, and in November 1864 a group of teetotalers, styled the "Ballarat District Temperance League", felt they could make it pay by bringing in classical theatre and elevating lectures, so purchased the business for £3000, renaming it "Temperance Hall". Invitations to the grand opening were limited to teetotalers so journalists were excluded, as were many investors, leaving around 25 to witness the proceedings, and no free publicity. Somehow Bowdlerized Shakespeare, lectures on healthy living and displays of gymnastics failed to attract the expected crowds, while the rebuilt "Charlie Napier" thumbed its nose at culture and thrived by hosting singing and dancing.

In January 1865 the "Royal" was sold to Walter Craig, a publican who ran the Royal Hotel on Lydiard street, (Note: Built by Thomas Bath in 1853 and known as Bath's Hotel, Ballarat's first and most popular. It was purchased by Craig in 1862 and rebuilt with three storeys and a tower.) but is remembered as the owner of the racehorse Nimblefoot. (Note: Craig died in August 1870, and never got to see Nimblefoot win the 1870 Melbourne Cup.) Craig closed the theatre for refurbishment, reopening in May 1865, with William Hoskins again as lessee and manager. The Theatre had become, with extensive modifications and the creation of several shops, the major tenant of "Theatre Royal Buildings". at 103 Sturt Street. Frank Varley was lessee September 1865 to September 1866, followed by James "Jimmy" Simmonds October 1866 to January 1868. He took a leaf out of the repertory clubs' system by issuing transferrable monthly tickets.

In 1869 the Port Phillip Hotel had to be demolished due to subsidence where the old Clare pit had been filled. The theatre was relatively unaffected, but required some underpinning. The hotel was replaced with "Mitchell's Building", of three-storeys.

The theatre re-opened in May 1871 for Mary Gladstane's company playing Giacometti's Elizabeth, Queen of England, followed by East Lynne. She returned a year later with Mary Stuart, a poorly received Macbeth and a reprise of Elizabeth, Queen of England, for which she was noted.

Quite Alone, an adaptation of Charlotte Bronte's novel Jane Eyre, played in December 1872, with Rose Evans (c. 1850 – 1 March 1875) as "Olive Garth", the first legitimate theatre production for some time.

In 1873 the "Royal" was closed again for major alterations, involving demolition of the front wall (including the foundation-stone).

Rosa Cooper and her husband Lionel Harding, who made their Australian debuts at the "Royal" on 23 November 1863 in Mary Elizabeth Braddon's Aurora Floyd, and came back in 1872 as a member of Mary Gladstane's company, with the play Jane Shore returned in August 1874 to take the lease of the "Royal" and reopened the theatre on 26 September 1874 with Leah the Forsaken. The Woman in Red followed, and was well patronised, but six weeks of hard work came to little for Cooper and her cast. The Herald of Melbourne poured scorn on Ballarat's taste in art. The Williamsons were a welcome "hit" with Struck Oil in December 1874.

The final performance given at the theatre was in July 1878 by the touring United States Minstrel Company, whose members included T. Hudson, Charles Holly, Louis Braham, G. W. Rockefeller, W. Hawkins and Edwin Amery, formed in Australia, largely from Emerson's California Minstrels.

== Aftermath ==
In 1887 the stage area was taken over by Crawford's drapery (owned by Snow and Room). Later tenants include Coulthard's Business College, Lederman's Gifts and Hairdressing, and Carlyon's Residential Hotel, which became Colthurst's Hotel around 1915.

== See also ==
- South Street Society, annual cultural festival in Ballarat from 1880; mentions many later theatres
