= Frank Towers =

Australian actor, playwright, and stage producer

Frank Towers (1835–1886) was an English actor, playwright and stage producer.

== History ==
Towers was born in London, son of Joseph Johnson Towers, actor and manager of The Old Vic theatre, who may have been of Jewish extraction, and Catharine Towers, née Woolf. The son was also an actor, and given a benefit performance at that theatre on 17 March 1859, the play being Never Too Late to Mend, from a novel by Charles Reade, concerning an English emigrant to Australia during the gold rush.

=== New Zealand ===
He emigrated to New Zealand (perhaps via Australia) where he partnered with Ann Jane "Annie" Glogowski, née Buckingham, who adopted the surname Towers. They had a daughter, Rosa Towers, in Dunedin, New Zealand, in 1864 and another, Kate Towers, in 1870 at the Thames, New Zealand, goldfield. He early discovered in Rosa an actress of some ability. With the permission of its author, B. L. Farjeon, he adapted Grif for the stage, and with Rosa in the title role, the play was a "hit" at the Queen's Theatre, Dunedin.

=== Australia ===
He first came to public attention in Australia in 1866 as an actor/producer from New Zealand who had leased the Royal Victoria Theatre with a cast he had picked up in Sydney: J. L. Byers, C. Miran, J. Clifford, Miss Young, Miss Kate Corcoran, J. B. Holland. and shortly thereafter at the New Lyceum with the melodrama It Is Never Too Late to Mend with a similar cast.

He returned to the Royal Victoria Theatre, Sydney, where A Waif of the Streets, written by Towers, opened on 19 October 1874, as a starring vehicle for his daughter Rosa (billed as "The greatest juvenile actress in the world") as "Miggs", her mother as "Melinda Mentap", and Towers himself as "Props the Footman". Grif was held in reserve against a decline in demand.

A Waif on the Streets opened at the Theatre Royal, Melbourne on 13 February 1875. They next played Grif and Waif at the Theatre Royal, Hobart, the latter being judged the better play. Launceston and Ballarat followed. They played the Theatre Royal, Adelaide in June 1875, during which Towers' Grateful, or Maggie's Dream was staged for the first time. As was their custom when playing a new town, one performance was set aside where children were admitted free. Brisbane followed, where Grateful was judged a "somewhat thrilling drama" In 1876 Towers made a return to Adelaide, where he appeared in various comic roles and undertook production duties for Samuel Lazar at the Theatre Royal; his wife found some congenial roles and the two children made occasional appearances.

=== Overseas ===
In January 1877 the family left for a tour of England, where he picked up a cast to play Grif, Waif, and Grateful. The company made a successful tour of England and, especially, Ireland. There was some concern for their safety when a body from the wreck of the ship James Service was identified as that of Mrs Towers, but proved to be mistaken identity. Rosa left the theatre to play vaudeville, and her parents found occasional work. Towers made progress on adapting Émile Zola's L'assommoir to the English stage. This was around the time Charles Reade published his play Drink, first performed at the Princess Theatre, London, in 1879, also an adaptation of L'assommoir, and mercilessly parodied (as Boozed) when it played in Melbourne in 1888. Towers' Drinking was first performed in South Africa on 17 December 1879, which may have been its last. They toured South Africa in 1880, taking the Theatre Royal, Cape Town (sub-leased from Captain Disney-Roebuck) and the Theatre Royal, Kimberley, in 1881, playing H.M.S. Pinafore with Towers as "Dick Deadeye", Rosa as "Josephine", and Kate as "Midshipman Mite". Their overseas tour had been lucrative, and Towers returned to Australia several thousand pounds the richer.

In January 1883 A Waif of the Streets was revived at the Gaiety Theatre, Sydney, with Kate playing the waif and Rosa (now too old for that role) as an actress.

Towers was lessee of the Victoria Theatre, Newcastle, for a period around 1883–1884.

Having lost money on several Australian ventures, Towers undertook a tour of India. He died there early in 1886, virtually destitute. His wife, seriously incapacitated and bedridden, died on 19 November 1887 in Whoro, (Note: This placename has not been found elsewhere, and may be a typographical error, but no alternative has been found.) India.

Nothing was heard from Rosa Towers after 1889, when she appeared in a restaging of Grif. Her early promise of great talent was not fulfilled. She had secretly married an actor named Woods and left her father's troupe, but no further information has been found.

== Works ==
- Grif (1874), adaptation of the novel Grif (Farjeon)
- A Waif of the Streets (1874)
- Grateful, or Maggie's Dream (1875)
- Drinking (1879), adaptation of L'assommoir (Zola)

He was also the author of several, perhaps many, pantomimes.

== Family ==
Frank Towers (1835–1886) married Ann Jane Glogoski or Glogowsky, née Buckingham (7 October 1835 – 19 November 1887) in 1882. The actor George Buckingham (6 November 1839 – 19 August 1864 [drowned in NZ]) was a brother. They had two daughters:

- Rosa Towers (18 November 1864 – ) was a notable juvenile lead. Rosa was his step daughter, her biological father was Samuel Glogoski.
- Kate Towers (1870– ) was an actress
