= A. C. Habbe =

Danish-born artist in Australia

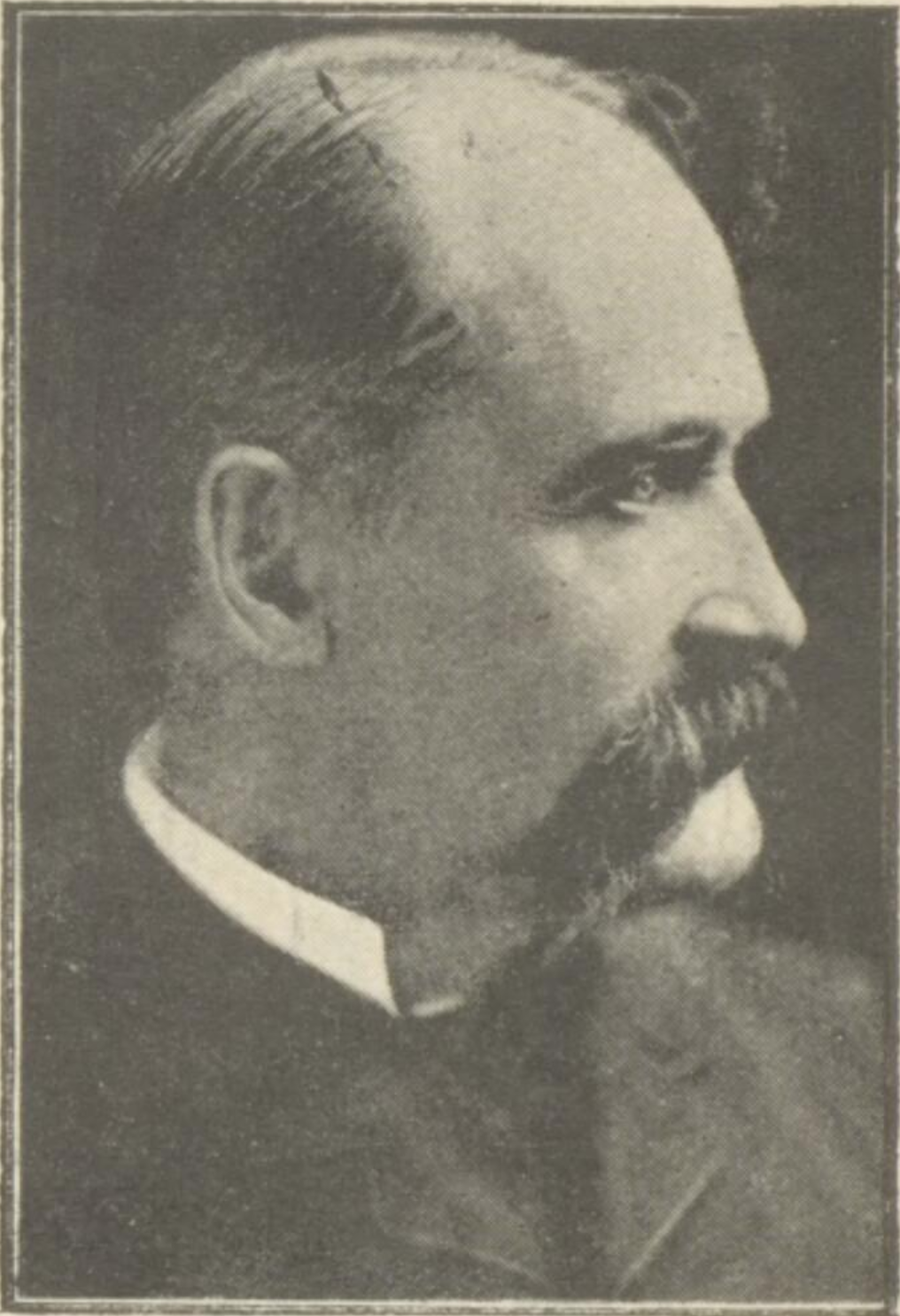
Alexander Christian Habbe

Alexander Christian Habbe (22 April 1829 – 14 April 1896) was a Danish-born artist in Australia, known for his scene paintings for major theatres in Sydney and Melbourne.

== History ==
Habbe was born in Copenhagen and saw action in the first First Schleswig War of 1848, when Denmark attempted to annexe Holstein. He was severely injured in the fighting, and was nearly two years in a military hospital. In 1855, he left with his older brother, the painter Nicholas Francis Habbe (10 April 1827 – 11 November 1889) for Victoria, where the goldfields were being overrun by hopeful miners. He had no luck, but found employment with the canvas theatres of Ballarat: Tom Hetherington's Theatre Royal and the Charlie Napier and Montezuma theatres, painting scenery and backdrops for the various burlesques and plays that provided entertainment for the diggers and their families. Stage scenery was taken seriously by critics and audiences, and the artist was often credited alongside the actors.

In 1858 he was employed by George Coppin, to paint scenes for the comedy An Unequal Match at the Theatre Royal, Melbourne. One of his first assignments in Melbourne was in April 1859 alongside William Pitt and W. J. Wilson, painting scenes for J. R. Planche's The Yellow Dwarf, directed by Fred Younge, at the Theatre Royal, Melbourne.

In 1860 he was in Sydney at the Victoria Theatre in Pitt-street, and afterwards at the Prince of Wales Opera House and the Queen's Theatre, then in 1865 left for Melbourne, where he worked for the opera impresario W. S. Lyster.

His work for the 1880 production of La Fille du Tambour-major at the Melbourne Opera House was highly regarded. He was also associated with George Gordon, of the Princess's Theatre, for many years.

His last notable work was for George Rignold's Henry V, also at the Melbourne Opera House. One critic thought Habbe "not exactly of the calibre of Gordon, Goatcher, Brunton, or Hennings, but did good work".

He died after some months' suffering from cancer of an internal organ, which he bore with patience and courage. In life he had been called "Crabby Habbe" on account of his cynical disposition, but one biographer said that "like a crab-apple, he was all harshness outside, but a good deal of sweetness within". Another held that he "possessed a great fund of dry humor, and quiet sarcasm, which made him a most entertaining companion". He never married.

His brother and mother both died in Sydney.

== Other scene painters of Australia ==
- John Brunton
- Alfred Clint
- Phil Goatcher
- George Gordon
- Harry Grist
- John Hennings
- Harry Holmes
- William Pitt
- W. J. Wilson
