= Marcus M. Pomeroy =

19th century American journalist

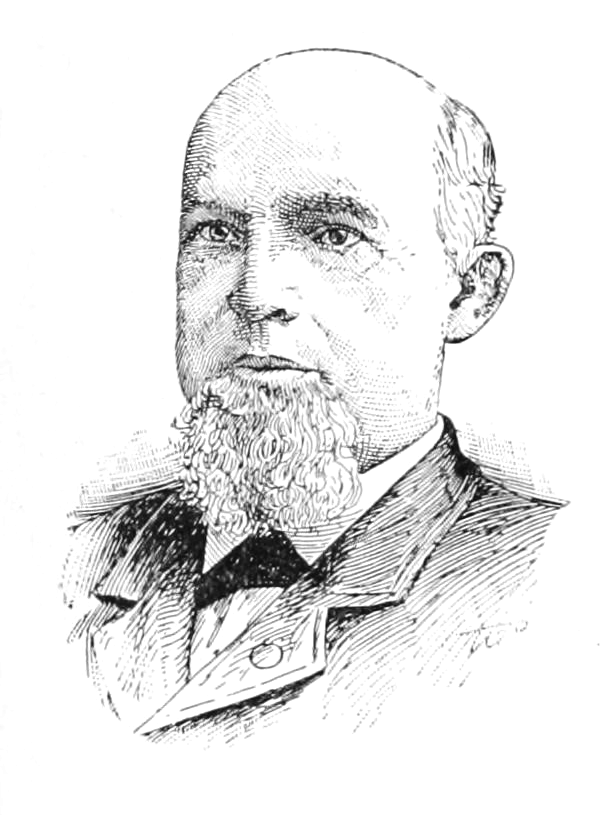
- Born: December 25, 1833; Elmira, New York
- Died: May 30, 1896 (aged 62); Brooklyn, New York
- Other name: Brick Pomeroy
- Occupations: Journalist, politician
- Political party: Democratic; Greenback; People's/Union Labor

Marcus Mills "Brick" Pomeroy (December 25, 1833 – May 30, 1896) was an American partisan newspaper publisher and Wisconsin pioneer. He is most notable for using his newspaper, the La Crosse Democrat, to publish anti-Lincoln and anti-war messaging during the American Civil War.

== Early life ==
Pomeroy was born in Elmira, New York in 1833. As a young man, he worked as a printer's devil.

== Career ==
Pomeroy established the first newspaper in Corning, New York, in 1854 and then moved to Wisconsin in 1857. He settled in La Crosse, Wisconsin, where he established the La Crosse Democrat newspaper, which he printed from 1860 to 1869 as a partisan Democratic newspaper. In 1869, he moved to New York City, where he began printing Pomeroy's Democrat. He brought the paper back to La Crosse in 1879 and continued printing until 1887.

It was during this time that he acquired the nickname "Brick". According to one account, after he had displayed skill in writing an article, another editor said that someone that could write so well was "a perfect brick" (i.e., a good fellow). According to another account, a journalist in the eastern United States had written a series of articles about celebrities called "charcoal sketches," and Pomeroy imitated these in a more extravagant manner, describing Wisconsin personalities and dubbing his articles "brick-dust sketches."

During the American Civil War, Pomeroy initially supported preservation of the Union and was commissioned as a second lieutenant in the Union forces. However, he later became a Copperhead, and in an editorial he called Abraham Lincoln "fungus from the corrupt womb of bigotry and fanaticism" and a "worse tyrant and more inhuman butcher than has existed since the days of Nero.... The man who votes for Lincoln now is a traitor and murderer.... And if he is elected to misgovern for another four years, we trust some bold hand will pierce his heart with dagger point for the public good."

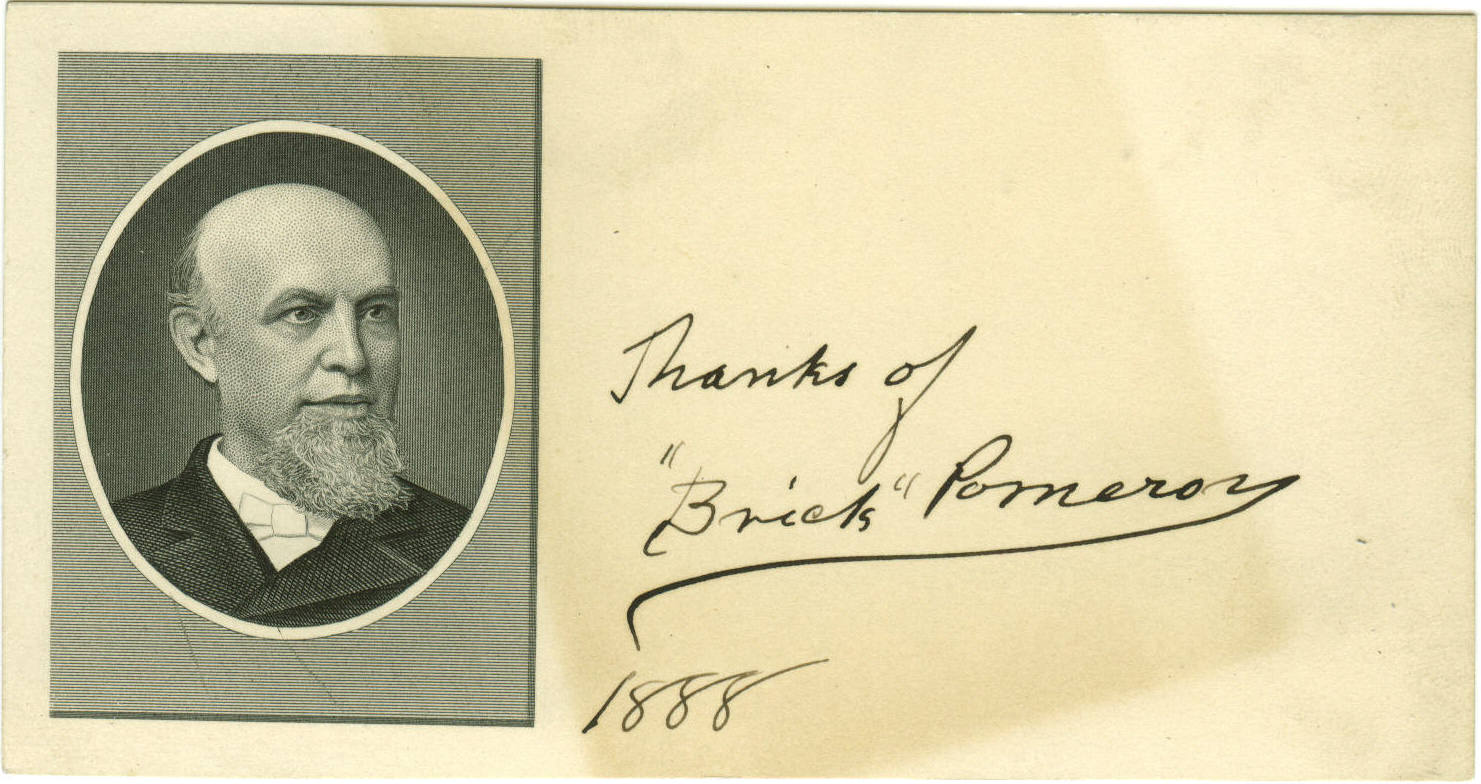
Marcus Mills "Brick" Pomeroy

Pomeroy relocated to New York in 1868, and then to Chicago in 1875, also spending time in Denver before returning to New York.

In later years, he became a leader of the Greenback Party and the People's Party/Union Labor Party of Wisconsin. During the 1880s he employed African-American journalist George Edwin Taylor as city editor of Pomeroy's Democrat. It claimed to have the largest circulation of any political newspaper in the country. In July 1891, he visited Logan County, West Virginia and interviewed William Anderson "Devil Anse" Hatfield.

Pomeroy died in Brooklyn in 1896.

== Family ==
Pomeroy married three times; his second wife, née Louise Rider or Ryder, became a celebrated Shakespearean actress, known as Louise Pomeroy.
