= Ernesto Rossi (actor) =

Italian actor and playwright (1827–1896)

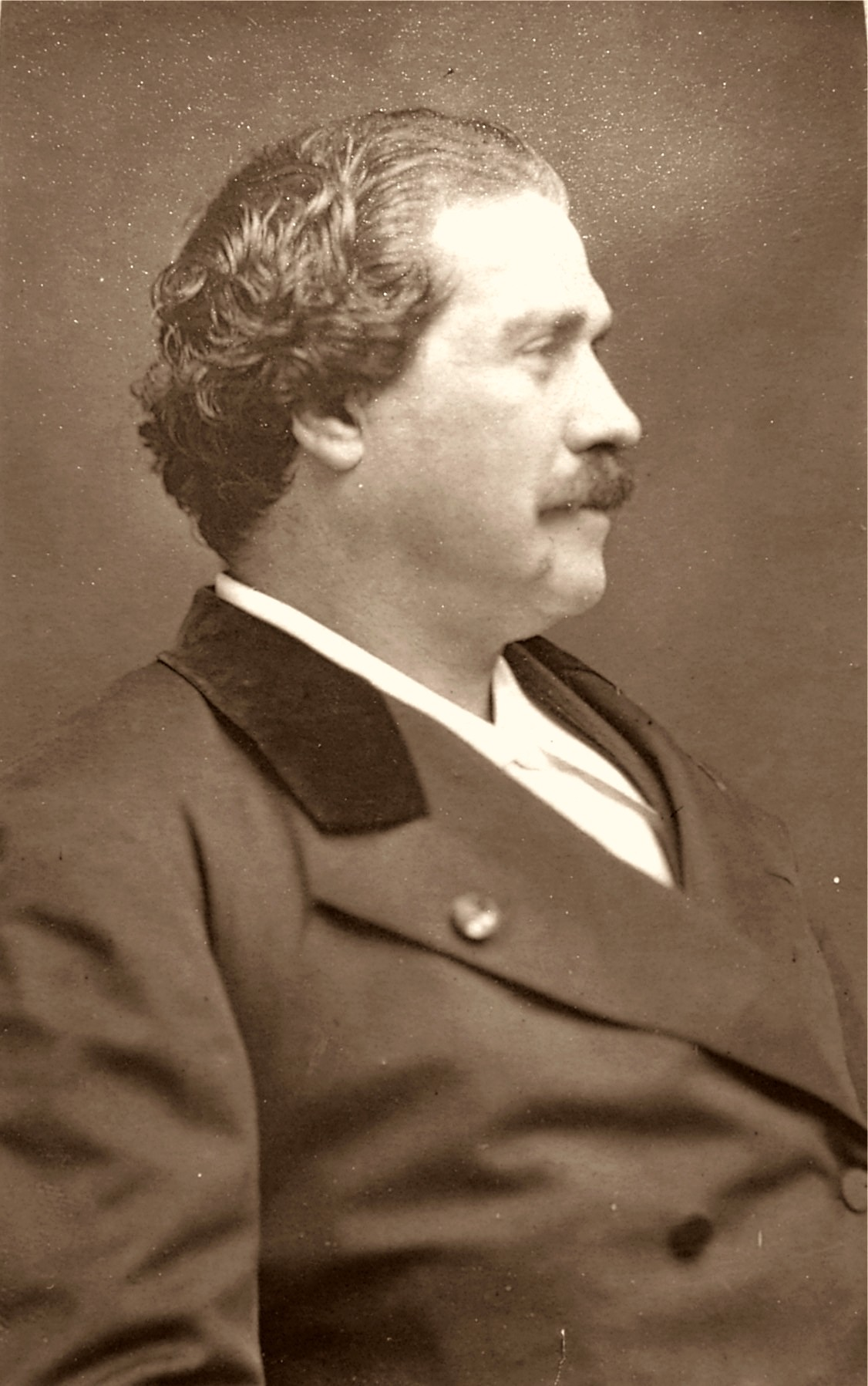
Ernesto Rossi

Ernesto Rossi (27 March 1827 – 4 June 1896) was an Italian actor and playwright.

== Early life and career ==
Rossi was born in Livorno to a middle-class family and intended to study at the university there when he substituted for an actor in the Calloud theatre company who had become ill. After his successful performance, he continued performing with the company until it was dissolved in 1848. In 1852, he joined the Reale Sarda theatre company and became its leading actor. He toured Italy and Paris with Adelaide Ristori until personal differences led to the end of their theatrical partnership, and Majeroni became her leading man.

Rossi went on to perform throughout Europe, including London, Vienna, Lisbon, and Moscow. He was particularly admired for his Shakespearean roles as Macbeth, King Lear, Romeo and Hamlet. Rossi also wrote several plays, the first of which, Adele, premiered with Adelaide Ristori in the title role.

In May 1896, he was playing King Lear in Odessa when he fell ill and was brought back to Italy, where he died a few weeks later in Pescara.

== Sources ==
- Biography of Rossi (in Italian) from the Museo Biblioteca dell'Attore, Genoa.
