= William Andrews (Australian actor) =

William Alexander Andrews (21 July 1836 – 28 September 1878), sometimes referred to as "Billy Andrews", was an Australian comic actor, who had a short career but was immensely popular, and like G. V. Brooke, became the yardstick by which later comedians were judged.

== History ==
Andrews was born at 64 George Street, Sydney, "opposite the Central Police Station", a son of Alexander Andrews and Hebe Andrews, née Chippendale (1815–1874), who married 17 May 1834.

Notable roles include:

- Felix O'Callaghan in His Last Legs (1865) also played by his brother Alex.
- Baillie Nichol Jarvie in Rob Roy (1869)
- the mock Duke in Honeymoon (1868)
- "Perkyn Middlewick" in Our Boys (1878)
- "Deacon Skinner" in Struck Oil (1875)
- "Scrubs" in Rory O'More, his last appearance, which he played for two nights at the Sydney Queen's Theatre, but was practically inaudible, and died three weeks later of Bright's disease at his home in Liverpool Street, Woolloomooloo. His wife, brother and sister were with him at the end.

Criticism of his work is hard to find — apart from being cast as the Artful Dodger in Oliver Twist, which part should have gone to a much smaller man. In other productions he played Mr Bumble.

== Family ==
Andrews was married and had three children by a previous marriage:

- eldest daughter (born 22 April 1866), no details yet found
- William Inglewood Andrews (c. 1863 – 13 August 1885)
- Elizabeth Andrews (c. 3 June 1869 – 3 February 1887)

His brother Alec Andrews (1845 – 3 January 1895) was also a comedian; he had a sister at 70 Albion Street, Surry Hills, and another brother, James, about whom little has been found. His widow remarried and lived in Melbourne.
