= Royal Lyceum, Sydney =

Theatre in Sydney, Australia

The Royal Lyceum was a small theatre in York Street, Sydney founded in 1854, which was redeveloped and renamed many times, finally as the Queen's Theatre, by which name it closed in 1882.

== History ==
In the late 1840s Malcom's Royal Australian Circus (later Amphitheatre) opened on the west side of York Street, Sydney between King and Market streets, one door from the latter. The venue specialised in equestrian displays and trick riding, tightrope dancing and "Olympic games". John Malcom was the proprietor.

It was refurbished and reopened in October 1854 as the Royal Lyceum Theatre, perhaps named after the theatre in Edinburgh, and frequently referred to as "the Lyceum". Its first lessees were the American C. R. Thorne (Note: Charles Robert Thorne (1814–1893) was husband of singer Ann Maria Thorne née Mestayer (1813–1881)) company, who were previously at the Victoria Theatre.

Not two years later, the theatre was taken over by W. H. Stephens and H. T. Craven, who refurbished its interior and in July 1856 renamed it and the hotel adjacent as "Our Lyceum". Improvements included a clerestory roof for better ventilation, boxes that gave a better view of the stage, and an enlarged orchestra pit. There was however a slump in stage productions and the theatre was mostly used for public meetings. Stephens was forced to declare insolvency. In 1866 the Lyceum, or "New Lyceum" with another renovation and new lessee Frank Towers, was reckoned one of three or four good theatres in Sydney (along with the Prince of Wales in Castlereagh Street, the Victoria Theatre in Pitt Street and, intermittently, the Opera House) but was "seldom open". In 1867 it became the Alexandra Hall, an assembly hall or salon de danse.

In 1869 the actor George Simms took over the lease from a John Clark, who was imprisoned that August for killing his wife Susan Martin Clark, reopening it as the Royal Adelphi Theatre on 4 September 1869. The partnership of Harding, Wilson and Habbe took over as managers, renovating and decorating the interior, reopening on 27 November. with Watts Phillips' drama The Poor Strollers with Rosa Cooper as Lady Camille. Later plays included the Australian premiere of The Lancashire Lass, directed by Cooper.

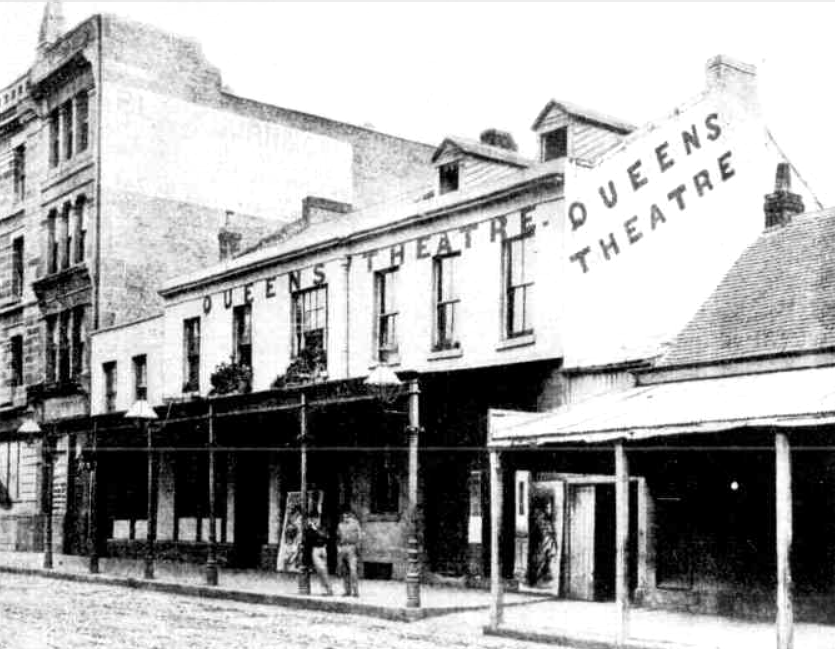
Queen's Theatre, Sydney

In 1873 it was renovated and renamed the Queen's Theatre, under management of W. B. Gill, after which it became a café chantant, to Punch's chagrin, then refurbished by Samuel Lazar and reopened in March 1875, to Mr Punch's evident approval. J. C. Williamson and Maggie Moore played Struck Oil at "The Queen's" in March, 1875.

In July 1877 C. Wheatleigh, took over management of the Queen's Theatre and scored several successes in Around the World in 80 days and The Shaughran. L. M. Bayless followed as manager a few months later, with the Simonsen company and the opera Giroflé-Girofla. Licensee of the Queen's Hotel adjacent was the boxer Larry Foley.

In July 1882 the Queen's Theatre was closed by Government order, as being unsafe. It was used by a commercial interest for some years, then demolished sometime before 1905.
