= Luscombe Searelle =

British impresario

William Luscombe Searelle (1853 – 18 December 1907) was a musical composer and impresario. He was born in Devon, England, and brought up in New Zealand, where he attended Christ's College, Christchurch.

Searelle began working as a pianist in Christchurch and graduated as a conductor. He sang, wrote, directed, and composed alongside conducting. At the age of 22, his comic opera, The Wreck of the Pinafore, was produced at the Gaiety Theatre in London. He wrote the comedic opera, Estrella, with Walter Parke, and it became a smash hit in Australia in 1884. In December of that year, Estrella went on at New York's Standard Theatre where it enjoyed just three performances before the theatre burnt down.

Of his comic opera Bobadil, one Melbourne critic wrote: “Mr. Searelle is a sworn foe of dullness and a warm friend of variety.” By 1886, in spite of favourable critics, Searelle was bankrupt and turned his sights to South Africa's newly discovered gold field.

His first visit to South Africa was in 1887 with an Australian Opera Company where several operas were staged in Cape Town, including three of Searelle’s own compositions; Bobadil, Estrella and Isadora. During his time here, he bought a 1600-hectare coal mine that yielded no coal, and he prospected for tin in Swaziland, with little success. He fought with the Boers and was finally hounded out of Johannesburg.

In 1889, an ox-wagon arrived at Johannesburg, bringing a small party of opera singers from their hotel rooms to welcome Searelle, tired from his long trek from the port at Durban. Among those to greet him were the talented Fenton sisters, Blanche, Searelle’s wife and Amy. They had first taken the train to the railhead in Ladysmith and then transferred to stagecoach for the rest of the journey. En route, the Fentons spent a night with a Boer family. While there Amy, the nineteen-year-old prima donna, was given the bed President Paul Kruger used when he passed that way, which was an enormous four-poster bed that had a ladder at its side for climbing up into.

In the days that followed, the contents of the ox-wagon filled the intersection with Eloff and Commissioner Street, where Luscombe Searelle’s corrugated iron “Theatre Royal” had been unloaded and was being hammered together. “The material blocked the road for days,” Headley A. Chilvers tells in his book Out of the Crucible, “but the blockade mattered little, for traffic passed easily by taking detours over the veld."

The wagon had a stage, stalls, comfortable boxes, a bar, as well as costumes, scenery, and dressing rooms for the opera stars. Following their arrival, the mining town received opera as its first serious form of entertainment. Searelle opened his first season with Maritana and The Bohemian Girl.

As an agent and producer, Searelle was responsible for theater celebrities coming from London. The most famous of which was the ex-opera star turned actress, Genevieve Ward. She arrived in 1891 describing Johannesburg as having "no pavements of any kind, yet the streets lighted by electricity, and the place but five years old".

In eleven weeks, she played in sixteen plays, including six by Shakespeare: Macbeth, Othello, Hamlet, The Merry Wives of Windsor, The Merchant of Venice, and Much Ado About Nothing.

In 1892, Searelle brought the partnership of Cora Urquhart Brown-Potter and the romantic lead Kyrle Bellew out from Australia. They toured South Africa with Hamlet and Romeo and Juliet; however, their run was cut short when the Exhibition Theatre in Cape Town burned to the ground. Despite his genius and sporadic successes, Searelle was to be dogged throughout his life with litigation and debt, leaving in his wake a story of misfortune.

Periodically, Searelle went on tour and took his company throughout South Africa, Rhodesia and Mozambique.

In 1905, he staged Bobadil in America, but his principals took off with his money, leaving him destitute. He survived selling dusters from door to door and occasionally received a pittance from the New York Journal for poems he submitted. His nights were frequently spent on benches.

Eventually Ella Wheeler Wilcox read his poetry, and together they wrote the opera Mizpah, based on the biblical story of Esther (1904-5). It was put on in San Francisco but by then Searelle was too ill; dying of cancer, he could only view its success from a wheelchair. After its premiere, he was wheeled before the audience to receive his ovation. Inspired he rushed to England to stage it there, but by then he was too ill and died on 18 December 1907, aged 54, before he could begin negotiations.

== Newspaper entries ==
"Mr. Searelle has made a noticeable improvement in the Theatre of Varieties by partitioning the auditorium from the bars. The partition which is the work of Messrs. Hart & Co., General Contractors, Eloff Street, is half glass and forms a handsome construction with swing doors, the noise of talking at the bar, always so annoying to those who wish to enjoy the entertainment, being considerably reduced."

"I noticed on Monday night that six policemen were stationed at the varieties. Is it fair that Mr. Searelle should monopolize the police force to the detriment of the town? I suppose the safety of the public can go ‘hang’ as long as Mr. Searelle can get ‘chuckersout’ on the cheap."

"I must really ask the Head of Police to step in and prohibit these Sunday evening shows. They are totally unnecessary and serve but to fill the pockets of the management with a few pounds, whilst the artists themselves reap no material benefit by having to give up their Day of Rest."

"It was indeed a pathetic scene enacted on Monday night when Miss Jenny Hill was induced by Mr. Luscombe Searelle to brave the cold winds that were sweeping the town and speak a piece to the audience assembled at the Theatre of Varieties. What legitimate reason can be tendered for ‘trotting her out’ to an audience of a Music Hall? Surely it was anything but decent to let her be almost carried on to the stage and, in a feeble voice, utter some platitudes about the climate of South Africa, the experience of her early career and the kindness shown to her by Mr. and Mrs. Searelle. Is there no limit to the impresario’s advertising dodges? Has it come to this that a lady, who is as near to her death bed as any human being can dread be, has to be the medium of advertising him on a bleak autumn night to an audience to which the sight appeared as painfully gruesome?"

"Mr. Luscombe Searelle alleges that he will not sue me for libel, as “he never casts his pearls before swine”. As much as I appreciate being likened unto ‘pearls’, I must really resent our judges being termed ‘swine’. Even by Mr. Luscombe Searelle. Who should know what a hog is. However, to me and space are too precious to be wasted on such an individual. He left Johannesburg on Saturday last seen in the company with a gentleman to whom he has bonded his entire theatre, and who was deservedly thrashed by a gentleman to whom he refused to pay what he owed him previous to parting. If more people took the law into their own hands and horse-whipped unscrupulous tricksters, who refused to discharge their obligations, neither Mr. Searelle nor his Compagnon de Voyage would have a whole shin today. Before going to America, Searelle went to London to clear his name with his agents. Although ‘The Critic’s time and space was too precious to waste on Mr. Searlle they continued a fervent reportage on him months after he departed South African shores."
