= Paolo Giacometti =

Italian dramatist

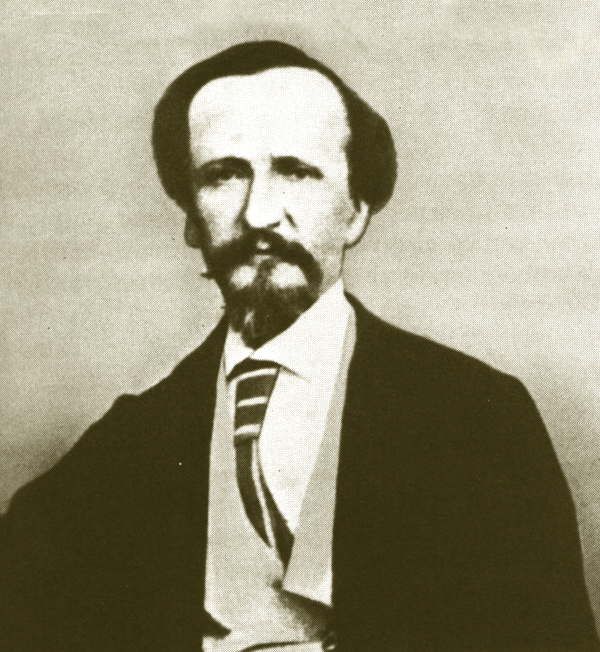
A portrait of Giacometti Paolo

Paolo Giacometti (1816–1882) was an Italian dramatist born at Novi Ligure. He was educated in law at Genoa, but at the age of twenty had some success with his play Rosilda and then devoted himself to the stage. Depressed circumstances made him attach himself as author to various touring Italian companies, and his output was considerable; moreover, such actors as Ristori, Rossi and Salvini made many of these plays great successes. Among the best of them were La Donna (1850), La Donna in seconde nozze (1851), Giuditta (1857), Sofocle (1860). La Morte civile (1861). A collection of his works was published at Milan in eight volumes (1859 et seq.). His Marie Antoinette was written expressly for Ristori, and first staged in New York.

An English-language version of his Elizabeth, Queen of England was performed by Mary Gladstane at the Princess Theatre, Melbourne on 23 July 1870. Madame Ristori performed the work in its original Italian on 10 August 1875 at the Melbourne Opera House.
