= Rosa Cooper =

English actor and manager

Rosa Cooper (1829 – 4 September 1877) was an English actor and manager, popular in Australia.

== History ==
Cooper was married to actor Lionel Harding; (Note: Born William Lionel Man (7 December 1832 – 30 March 1904), Harding was an English actor and stage manager with rumored links to the aristocracy. He was a friend of Lord Belmore, the Governor of New South Wales, and a welcome guest at Government House.) the two frequently appeared on stage together.

They first appeared on the Australian stage at the Theatre Royal, Ballarat on 23 November 1863 in Mary Elizabeth Braddon's Aurora Floyd, followed by Bendigo in December 1863 with the drama Catherine Howard; or, the Throne, the Tomb, and the Scaffold, with Cooper as Howard, betrothed and secretly married to Percy, Duke of Northumberland, played by Harding.

In 1869 Harding, Habbe and Wilson refurbished Sydney's Alexandra Hall, renaming it the Theatre Royal Adelphi. Among the plays that opened there was Cooper's production of H. J. Byron's The Lancashire Lass on 23 July 1870, an Australian premiere.

She was particularly noted for her Lady Isabel in East Lynne.

She returned to Ballarat in October 1874 with an excellent supporting cast, for a strenuous 6-week program of quality drama, but barely met expenses, leading the Melbourne Herald's critic to pour scorn on the town's artistic taste.

She was ailing when she left Australia by the RMSS Pera in 1875, and died of cholera in India shortly after being released from hospital.
