= Samuel Lazar =

Australian theatre manager, producer of pantomimes and operas, and occasional actor

Samuel Lazar (1838 – 14 November 1883) was an Australian theatre manager, producer of pantomimes and operas, and occasional actor.

== History ==
Lazar was a son of theatre manager John Lazar, and as a child frequently appeared on stage in his father's productions, as did his sister Rachel (c. 1827–1897), who married Andrew Moore, and was mother of theatrical agent John Moore.

He served as clerk to Burnett Nathan, then for Gabriel Bennett of the firm Bennett & Fisher. In 1867 he and Bennett had a third share (with J. M. Wendt and John Temple Sagar) in building Adelaide's Theatre Royal in Hindley Street, which he managed. He faced insolvency in 1871.

His big break came in March 1875 when he took J. C. Williamson and Maggie Moore's play Struck Oil to the Queen's Theatre, Sydney, which he enlarged and refurbished, then back to Adelaide's Theatre Royal. He returned to Sydney, where he was involved in building the new Theatre Royal, of which he was lessee and manager from December 1875. James "Jem" Booty was his distinguished treasurer until 1878, when their relationship broke down.

The second theatre of that name, it was built at the corner of King and Castlereagh streets on the site of the old Prince of Wales Theatre, which was destroyed by fire in 1872.

Opening night of the first production, Henry James Byron's Daisy Farm on 11 December 1875, was attended by some 2700 patrons. He had a major coup with The Old Corporal, Eduardo Majeroni's first role in English, which opened 24 April 1876 to great applause.

He produced several Christmas pantomimes in the 1870s, notably those by Garnet Walch and John Strachan.

In July 1876 Lazar made a rare acting appearance as Chrysos in W. S. Gilbert's comedy Pygmalion and Galatea starring Eleanor Carey, and was well received. He also played Sir Anthony Absolute in Sheridan's The Rivals in 1880.

This theatre struggled financially until its chief competitor, the Victoria Theatre itself was destroyed by fire in August 1880.

Lazar maintained the lease until 1882, his last production being the pantomime Sinbad the Sailor which ran from 27 December 1881. The theatre then came under the control of J. C. Williamson, Arthur Garner, and George Musgrove.

After some months of exhibiting aberrant behaviour, Lazar was in February 1882 admitted to Dr. Arthur J. Vause's (previously Dr. G. A. Tucker's) private lunatic asylum at Cooks River. where he died in 1883. He never married and is not known to have any children. His sister Victoria Lazar (c. 1838–1926) inherited the lease of the Theatre Royal. She married Simeon Moss in 1885.

== Other interests ==
Lazar was a keen follower of horse racing, and was an excellent billiards player, not being disgraced in a match against John Roberts, jun. on that champion's first Australasian tour.

He wrote the libretto for a musical The Beast, a bound copy of which, undated and unpublished, is held by the Mitchell Library in Sydney.
