= Opera House, Sydney =

Theatre in Sydney (1879–1900)

Coordinates: 33°52′08″S 151°12′20″E

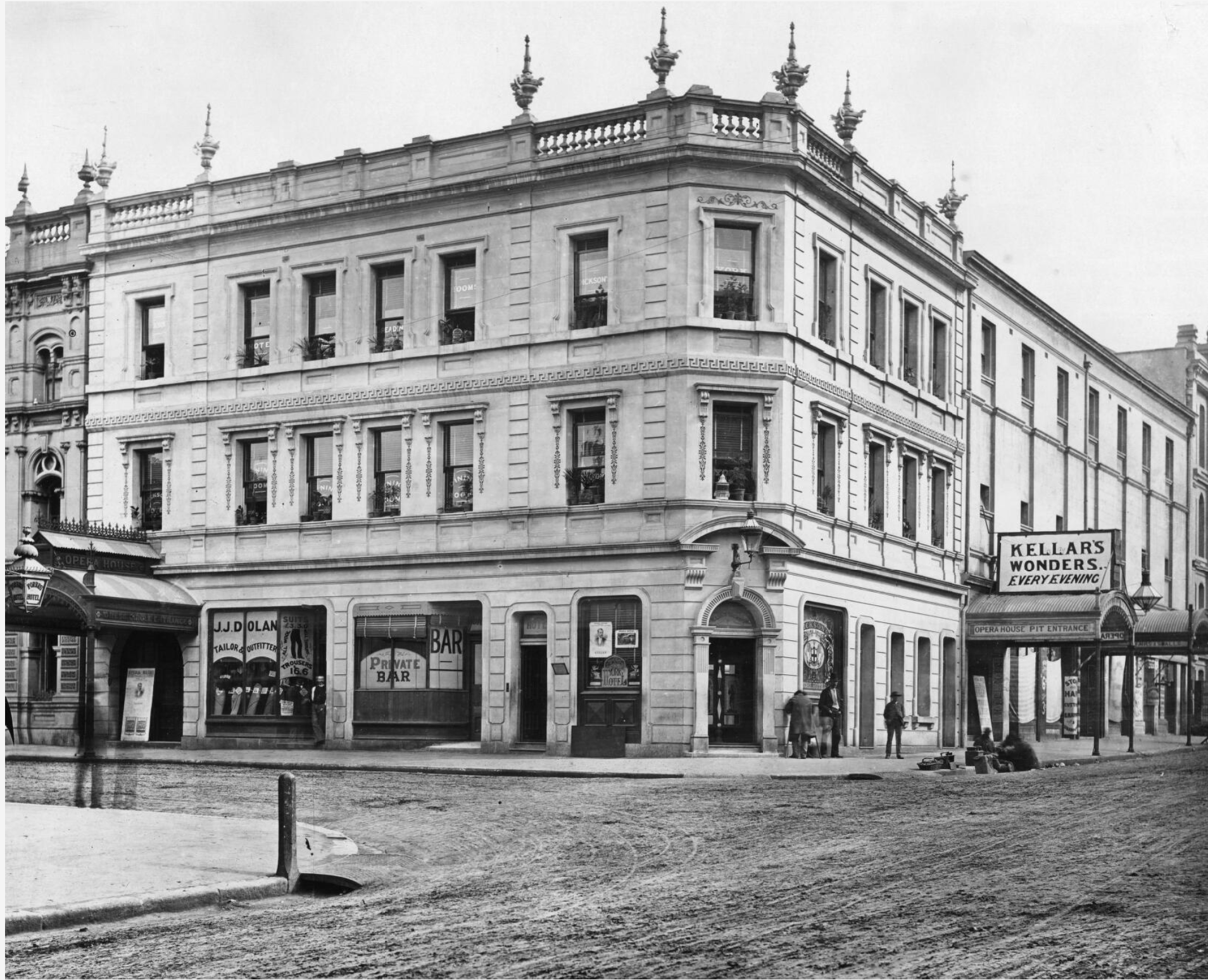
Sydney Opera House, corner King and York Streets, in 1882

Long before the famous Sydney Opera House on Bennelong Point, the city of Sydney, New South Wales, Australia, had several entertainment venues described as "opera houses".

== Sydney Opera House (1879–1900) ==
Built in 1879 on land owned by I. J. Josephson and opened as Kelly and Leon's Opera House for the New York minstrel company of drag performers Edwin Kelly and Francis Leon, it was situated on King Street near the York Street intersection; a number of smaller buildings at the corner of Pitt Street and York Street being demolished to make way for the grand building. The architects were Backhouse & Sons. When Kelly and Leon's lease expired in 1880, their name was dropped and the venue was advertised for lease.

It reopened as "Sydney Opera House" in September 1880 and for much of the 1880s was under the management of W. J. Wilson, who was joined by Eduardo Majeroni in 1884.

In February 1900 the orchestra struck for payment of arrears in wage payments and rather than concede, the management closed the theatre. By this time, owned by Percy Josephson, it became a warehouse for W. and A. McArthur, Ltd. and was demolished in 1927. Construction on the Grace Building started at the site in 1928.

Some successes were:

- The Doctor of Alcantara, played by Kelly and Leon 1879–1880
- The Guv'nor and Chawles played by Fred Marshall's Comedy Company
- Boccaccio played by Emilie Melville's Opera Company
- Il trovatore and Mignon played by The Montague Turner Company.
- Patience played by the Royal Comic Opera Co.
- The Strategist and The Candidate played by the Polks
- Manola, Les Manteaux Noirs, and The King's Dragoons played by the Dunning Opera Co.
- Diplomacy, The Woman in White, and The Squire played by Wybert Reeve in 1883
- The Country Girl, The Busybody, and The School for Scandal played by Marie de Grey in 1884
- Jo and The Grasshopper played by Jennie Lee
- Mammon, (Note: Written by Sydney Grundy; known as The Bunch of Violets when later played by H. Beerbohm Tree) The Queen's Favorite, and Forget-Me-Not, played by Genevieve Ward, W. H. Vernon and Roland Watts-Phillips in 1885
- The Life of an Actress, George W. Anson
- Jem the Penman, Harry St. Maur and Agnes Thomas in 1886
- My Sweetheart played by Minnie Palmer
- Ingomar and Romeo and Juliet played by Essie Jenyns
- Hide and Seek played by Walter Craven in 1887
- Fedora and Marie Antoinette played by The Majeronis

Fayette, a new opera due to open on 17 February 1900, never opened.
