= Prince of Wales Theatre, Sydney =

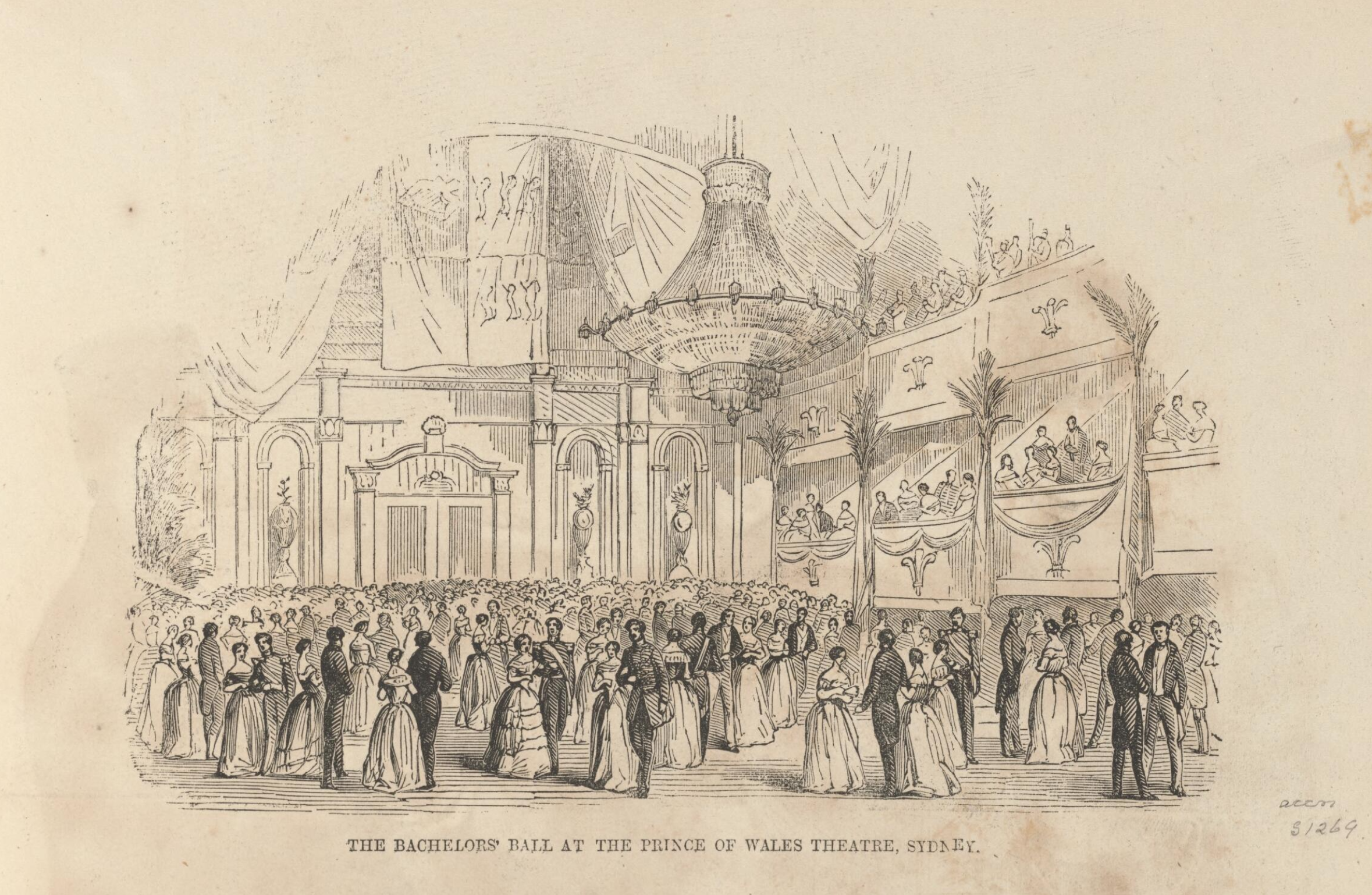
The Bachelors' Ball at the Prince of Wales Theatre, Sydney 1857

The Prince of Wales was a theatre in Castlereagh Street, Sydney, New South Wales. It was destroyed by fire and rebuilt twice; the second time as the Theatre Royal.

== History ==
The theatre, near the corner of King and Castlereagh streets, was built for Joseph Wyatt, who had earlier built the Royal Victoria Theatre in Pitt Street, and opened on 12 March 1855 with William Dind his co-manager. It was designed to accommodate around 3,000 patrons: 1500 in the pit (stalls), 500 in the dress circle; gallery 500 and upper boxes 750. (Note: For theatre section terminology, see Auditorium#Auditorium structure) The first lessee was J. Gordon Griffiths, and the first production was Knowles' The Hunchback, starring Mr and Mrs Waller. As the second large theatre in Sydney it could not attract entrepreneurs and it became, briefly, a casino in 1856.

Wyatt was forced to sell the theatre in 1858; he was declared insolvent and died 19 July 1860. The theatre was destroyed by fire on the morning of 3 October 1860. It started at Holmes's bakery adjoining; three people died as a result of a wall of the burning theatre collapsing.

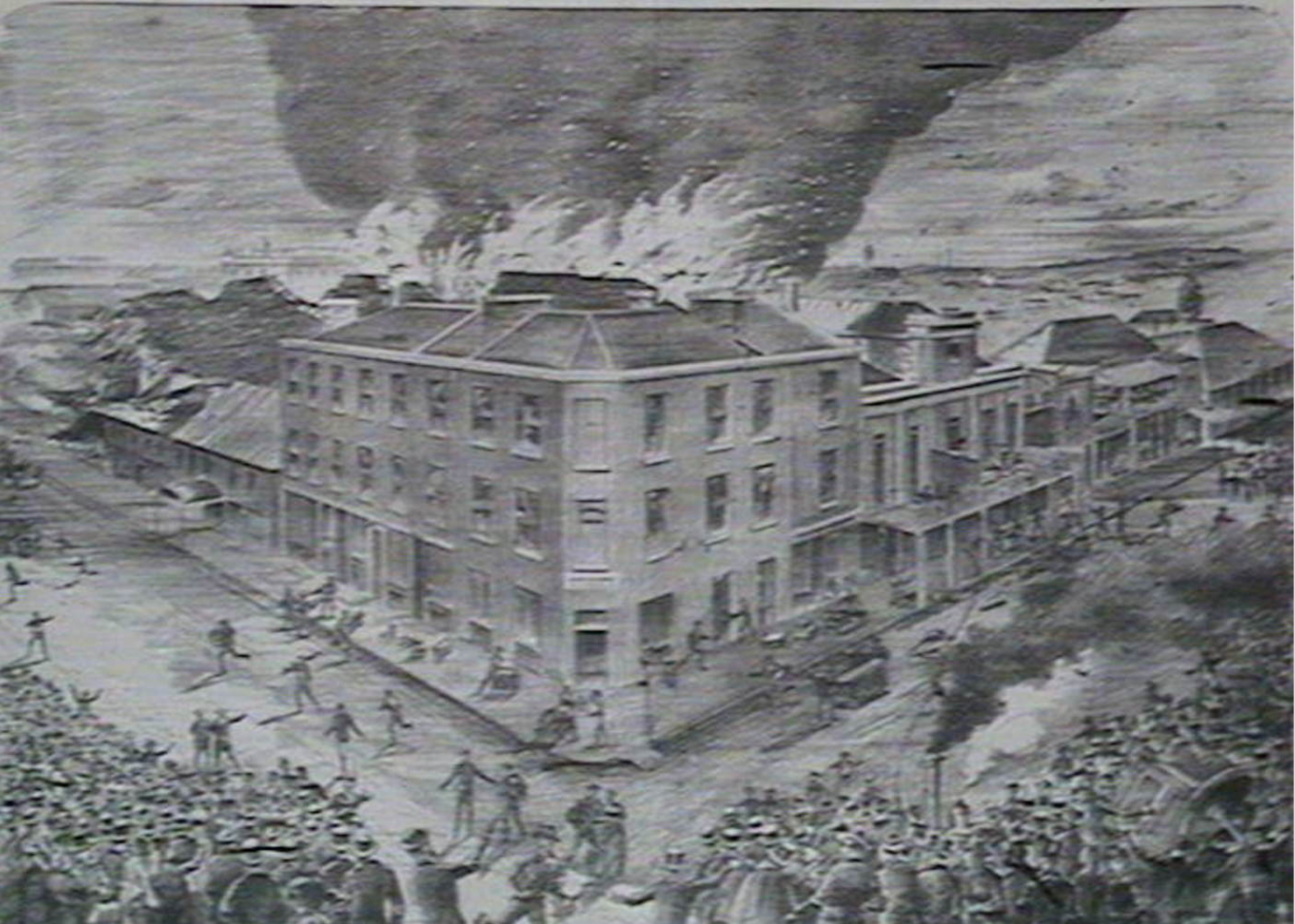
Burning of Prince of Wales Theatre, Sydney on 6 January 1872

It was rebuilt as the Prince of Wales Opera House by Robert Fitzgerald and opened on 23 May 1863 with Flotow's Martha, played by Lyster's Opera Company. Robertson died in 1865 and ownership of the theatre passed to his children by his first wife. David Crabb lost money as lessee; Edgar Ray followed in 1867, and despite spending a fortune on improvements and a high-class production of Leman Rede's Our Village, theatre-goers stayed away and he too was driven to insolvency. By 15 November 1867 George Coppin had taken over as lessee, with J. R. Greville as stage manager; William Dind succeeded Coppin in 1868. The theatre was destroyed by fire on the morning of 6 January 1872. Two firemen were killed when a wall of the burning theatre collapsed and another died of injuries. Their names were James Coates, Henry Vaughan, and Charles Tost. The last performance at the theatre was the pantomime The House that Jack Built which had been losing money. The theatre manager William Dind, who was uninsured, lost heavily and quit the business.

It was rebuilt for Samuel Lazar as the Theatre Royal, which opened on 11 December 1875 with H. J. Byron's Daisy Farm, Adelaide Bowring and W. J. Holloway in the leading roles.
