= J. R. Greville =

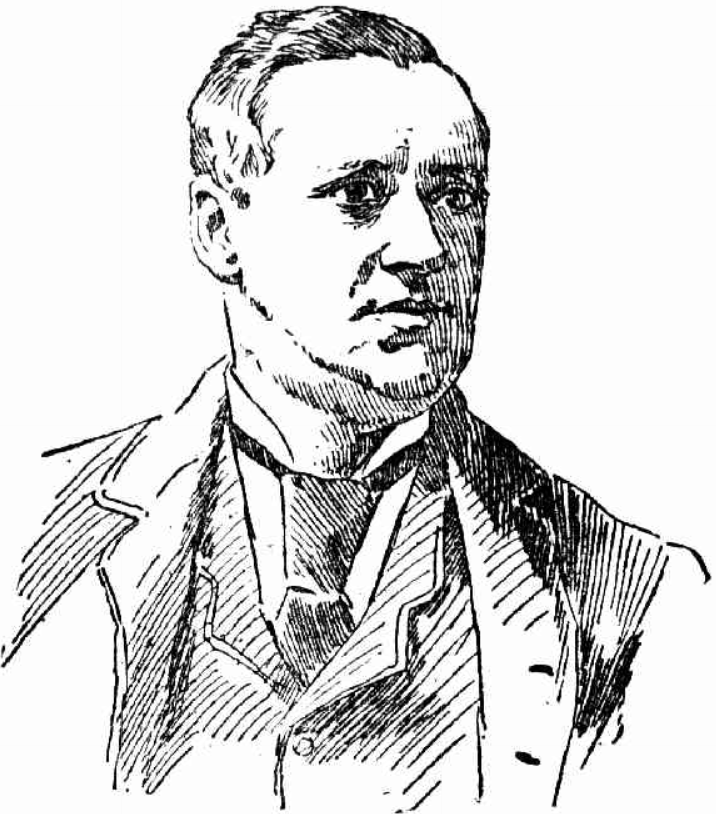
John Rodger Greville

John Rodger Greville (15 June 1834 – 29 April 1894) was an Irish-born comic actor, singer, songwriter and stage manager who had a long career in Australia.

== History ==
Greville was born John Rodger in Dublin, Ireland, a son of John Rodger JP (c. 1812–1897) and his wife Jane Rodger, née Greville (died 1899). His first acting experience was in May 1851, when he played Rochester in a comedy entitled Charles II, with Dublin's Royal Phoenix Amateur Theatre.

In 1852 the family emigrated to Victoria, Australia, where Greville made his first stage appearance at the Queen's Theatre, Melbourne, singing with Charles Young at a Saturday night concert run by violinist Joseph Megson. He made his way to the Bendigo goldfields, where he was soon disabused of any hopes of "striking it lucky", and settled for more congenial work as an entertainer at Cairncross's Theatre, singing comic songs of his own invention, and taking small acting parts with the Ramsay and Walshe company.

He worked for some months at Latham and Watson's store, then moved to Back Creek, near Maryborough, then to Ballarat, where he worked for several years and married. He was there at the time of the Eureka Rebellion (December 1854), when he was arrested for sedition, but soon released. In 1855 he took over management of Ballarat's Theatre Royal and the Montezuma Theatre, where plays produced include The School for Scandal, with Greville playing Crabtree. He also appeared at the nearby Shamrock Theatre, playing tragic parts as well as the comic, at which he excelled. He also played at the Charlie Napier Hotel's playhouse, where he became associated with G. V. Brooke and George Coppin.

In 1858 Greville was in a company with Edmund Holloway and Ben Webster, that had a long and profitable season at the Victoria Theatre, Adelaide, followed by Hobart and Launceston, then with John Hennings leased the Princess's Theatre, Melbourne for a short season.

=== As stage manager ===
In July 1860 he was employed as stage manager at the Theatre Royal, Bendigo, (previously Shamrock Theatre) for manager Alex Henderson. In 1861 George Coppin recruited him to manage the Pantheon Theatre at his Cremorne Gardens, succeeding Richard Younge (brother of Fred). This was followed in 1862 by the Theatre Royal, Geelong, where Meadows was lessee, and the Princess's for James Simmonds, then to the Victoria Theatre, Adelaide 1863–1865 for B. M. Nathan, when he famously played the second gravedigger to Charles Dillon's Hamlet. He returned to Melbourne to manage Coppin's Haymarket Theatre 1866–67, then the "indefatigable stage manager" was off to Sydney and the Prince of Wales Opera House 1867–68. In 1868–69 he was stage manager of the Theatre Royal, Ballarat, where he played O'Callaghan in the afterpiece His Last Legs, which he would reprise many times. From 1869 to 1872 he was stage manager for the partnership of Coppin, Harwood, Stewart and Hennings in management of the Theatre Royal, Melbourne and St George's Hall Among his celebrated roles in this period were:

- "A Party by the Name of Johnson" in A Lancashire Lass
- Widow Twankey in the pantomime Aladdin
- First gravedigger in Hamlet
- Pistol in Henry V

=== As theatre manager ===
From 1877 to 1882 he was partner with Coppin and Hennings, lessees and managers of the Theatre Royal, appearing in various plays, notably as

- Larry O'Phesey in Meritt and Harris's play Youth

== Other interests ==
Greville was fond of fishing, and he was an active member of Oddfellows.

He never bothered to assume a character; he played every part as himself, and the audience loved him for it.

No comedian has pleased the Melbourne public so long, and he was received with almost as great favour in the neighbouring colonies.

He had a happy marriage; they put away a tidy sum, and were fortunate not to lose it in the bank crash of May 1893 as happened to others such as Harwood and Stewart. In 1899 Mr and Mrs Greville took a long holiday to Great Britain, France and Italy.

He suffered from an internal complaint for the last few years of his life, but the end came swiftly. His remains were buried at the Melbourne General Cemetery. His tombstone bore the inscription "A fellow of infinite jest"

== Family ==
Greville's father, John Rodger, was an aerated water manufacturer in Vaughan, Victoria, and died 19 May 1897. One report has him moving to Castlemaine, Victoria in 1897 at age 80. Greville's mother died at Vaughan on 22 October 1899 aged 84.

In 1855 Greville married "Miss Webster" (née Charlotte Augusta Marshall) (1841 – 4 January 1912) Greville often played alongside his father-in-law, Ben Webster (1797–1882). Their children include:

- Sampson John Rodger Greville (7 March 1862 – 24 July 1919) was a medical doctor in Geraldton 1894–1900 He married Clara Harper Bell (c. 1872 – 6 December 1945) on 13 February 1906
  - Rodger Greville (31 March 1910 – 1994)
  - Hugh Greville (24 August 1912 – )
  - Ivo Greville (30 October 1914 – )
- Robert William Rodger "Bob" Greville (14 March 1864 – 24 December 1951), was an actor with the Maggie Moore company at the Theatre Royal, Melbourne, then in 1896 moved to Perth to support his brother's medical practice. He worked as a pharmacist in Geraldton, retired to Darlington. He married Florence Evelyn Stone (died 3 March 1954) on 4 September 1899.
  - John Rodger "Jack" Greville (4 February 1903 – 3 June 1926), clerk with National Bank of Australasia, was robbed and murdered
  - Mary Ellen Greville (1907– ) married Frederick Graham George

They had a home at Drummond Street, Carlton, Victoria.
