= John Dunn (actor) =

Comic actor who had a considerable career in Australia

John Dunn (c. 1813 – 17 August 1875) was a comic actor who had a considerable career in Australia.

== History ==
Dunn, born John Benjamin Donoghue, was a comic actor of Irish ancestry but born in Surrey, England. He studied Law for a time before abandoning it for the London stage, first playing Shakespeare, and was noticed by Charles Kean, then low comedy with David Osbaldiston (1794–1850), when he came under the influence of Thomas D. Rice, whose eccentric Jim Crow routine had become hugely popular. Dunn adopted the Jim Crow character and enjoyed some success for a time, then took it to America, where again he was well received.

=== Australia ===
He arrived in Sydney from California with his family in mid-1856 and first appeared in (That) Rascal Jack with his daughter Rosa Dunn and Thomas Smith Bellair at the Victoria Theatre on 21 July 1856, but soon moved to Melbourne, where his first appearance was at the Theatre Royal on 3 November 1856, when he and Rosa played The Cobbler and his Wife. He enjoyed considerable success in comedy, frequently appearing with comic Richard Stewart. He tried to repeat his success in England and America playing Jim Crow routines, but failed to enthuse Australian audiences, so was abandoned.

In 1857 he and Rosa had a successful tour of Tasmania, followed in 1858–1859 by the goldfield towns of Victoria, then returned to Melbourne, appearing at the Princess's Theatre and the Theatre Royal, playing with William Macready, Charles Kean and Fred Younge.

=== Death ===
He collapsed while walking along Lygon Street on his way to the Melbourne Opera House where he was due to appear in The Fool of the Family. He was taken to the hospital, where he was pronounced dead. His funeral was unusual: a service was conducted at the Melbourne General Cemetery by a Roman Catholic priest, as that was his faith, but his remains were buried in the Anglican section, the denomination to which his wife and family belonged. The pall-bearers were his son Arthur Dunn and son-in-law Marcus Clarke, along with H. G. Turner of the Commercial Bank, Chapman, the music publisher, and theatre identities Richard Stewart, John Hennings, Stuart O'Brien, Henry Harwood, Samuel Lazar, James Williamson, Wheatleigh and Greville.

== Family ==
Dunn married Maria Louisa Campbell-Voullaire; they had two sons and two daughters:

- Rosa Dunn played Juliet at age 15 and was one of George Coppin's leading ladies (with Julia Matthews and Rose Edouin) when he opened at the Cremorne Gardens, Melbourne in 1856. She married prominent grain merchant L. L. Lewis (c. 1835 – 21 December 1910) on 16 October 1863.
- Marian (often "Marion") Dunn (born c. 1847 – 4 December 1914) married Marcus Clarke on 22 July 1869; they had six children, including Marian Marcus Clarke. Marcus Clarke was for a time Registrar of Births and Deaths in Melbourne, and after his death the post was given to his widow, then his two daughters in turn, then the widow of his eldest son.
- son, yet to find
- Arthur Dunn (c. 1851 – 4 August 1888), employed by the Bank of New South Wales

They had a home at 244 Cardigan Street, Carlton, Victoria.
