= Grattan Riggs =

American actor

Thomas Grattan Riggs (January 1835 – 15 June 1899) was a US-born actor who had a significant career in Australia portraying Irish characters, though he never visited Ireland.

== History ==
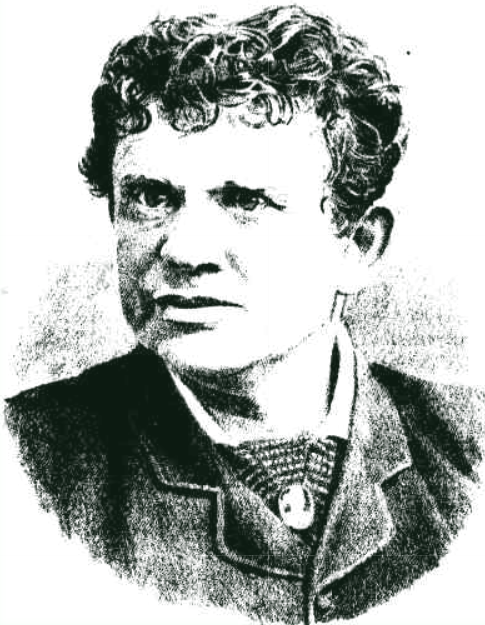
Grattan Riggs

Riggs was born in Buffalo, New York, to parents from County Westmeath, and took to the stage when quite young, but his burgeoning career in America was cut short by the Civil War. He was one of the four founders of the Benevolent and Protective Order of Elks.

He came to Australia under contract to Coppin & Harwood or Coppin, Greville & Hennings, appearing first on 27 March 1880 at the Theatre Royal, Melbourne, as Suil Gair and three other characters in John F. Poole's (Note: Not to be confused with John Poole. John F. Poole (1833–1893) was the author of numerous plays and skits around the archetypal (or stereotypical) Irishman (see Tony Pastor). He wrote the lyrics for Finnegan's Wake.) drama "Shin Fane or Shamrock Green", written expressly for him. This "sorry piece of patchwork", according to one critic, nevertheless delighted a large audience.

For his portrayal of Irish brogue and mannerisms, he was said to be the equal of John Drew, or better.

== Death ==
In later years Riggs suffered from dropsy and jaundice, and despite entreaties of friends anxious about his health, he embarked on a tour of Tasmania, playing his most famous successes: Shin Fane, The Irish Detective, and Conn the Shaughraun (i.e. vagabond). Collapsing after a performance at the Gaiety Theatre, Zeehan, his last words spoken on stage implored the audience to remember "poor old Conn". He died in the Strahan hospital, and was buried in the town's cemetery. This was the place where twelve months previously (10 June 1898) he had broken his arm.

His headstone read "Don't forget the poor Shaughraun. In memory of Thomas Grattan Riggs, Born at Buffalo, U.S.A., 1835; Died 15th June 1899, Aged Sixty-four years. Erected by His Friends."

The Elks, the fraternal order of which he was a lifetime member, arranged in 1908 to provide a headstone for his grave.

Than him no kindlier-hearted man or woman ever lived, and the name of Thomas Grattan Riggs will be long remembered throughout Australasia as that borne by a fine actor and an honorable man.

== Family ==
Riggs married twice; his first wife having died young, he married again in 1865, to one Lizzie Cade. She also died; their son, Anthony Riggs, had a career in America as a tenor on the comic opera stage.
