= Henry R. Harwood =

Australian actor and theatre manager

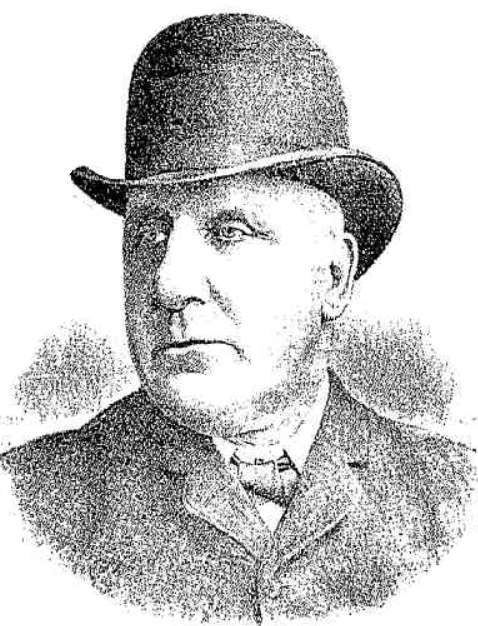

Henry Richard Harwood (c. 1831 – 16 April 1898) was an Australian actor and theatre manager.

== History ==
Harwood was born in London. His father, name not found (died c. 19 February 1872), was a builder and contractor, which was Harwood's profession when he emigrated to Victoria, Australia in 1852. In 1855, while on a visit to Sydney, he made his first appearance on the stage as Flavius Corunna in Payne's Brutus, being staged by G. V. Brooke at the Victoria Theatre. He took on the job of prompter with the company, thereby gaining practical knowledge of stage management.

He returned to Victoria, and joined a company at Ballarat, playing comic characters, such as Blueskin in Jack Shepherd. He was an expert horseman, and appeared in such equestrian plays as Mazeppa, Dick Turpin, and Timor the Tartar at Geelong.

He rejoined Brooke, playing Shakespeare parts: playing Macduff, Richmond, Brabantio, Dogberry, Holofernes, Enobarbus, and Antonio; Leonata in Much Ado About Nothing at Geelong, and as "Ancient Pistol" in The Merry Wives of Windsor in Melbourne. He became immensely popular, appearing in a variety of roles in every kind of play, and in his day he was one of the best-known and most appreciated actors in Australia.

Characters for which he was remembered include Mo Davis, Sam Boker and Mike Feeny in Boucicault's plays The Flying Scud, Formosa, and Arrah-na-Pogue respectively; the Duke de la Volta in La Fille du Tambour Major, the Duc des Ifs in Olivette, Uncle Cattermole and Gregory Grumbledon in Charles Hawtrey's The Private Secretary, and King Laurent in La Mascotte. He played De Sartoris in Frou-Frou, Geoffry Delamayne in Frank Mayo's dramatization of Man and Wife, Cassandra in Akhurst's Siege of Troy, Barry Sullivan in R. P. Whitworth's Catching a Conspirator; and The Pickpocket, and Cabriol in the comic opera The Princess of Trebizonde.

=== Theatre management ===
Barry Sullivan was sole lessee and manager of the Theatre Royal, Melbourne, from March 1863 to 16 February 1866, when he played his last night and relinquished management. His lease still had a year to run, and he sublet it to William Hoskins, but it was taken over by a partnership of Harwood, Stewart, Bellair, Vincent, Hennings, and Lambert, then when the lease came up in 1867, a new partnership of George Coppin, Stewart, Harwood and Hennings took it over. Coppin bought his partners out, and was sole manager in April 1872 when the theatre burned down. Coppin immediately rebuilt it bigger and better (the new theatre could seat 4,000 people over four tiers), and opened in November the same year, under joint management by Coppin, Stewart, Harwood and Hennings. Harwood retired in 1877.

Harwood had invested a good deal of his earnings in bank stocks and was confident of a secure retirement, when much of his assets was wiped out in the Australian banking crisis of 1893, and he was forced, like Stewart, to return to the boards, and he took part in The Private Secretary, and other plays in both Australia and New Zealand, with the Thornton company.

He died from a heart complaint.

== Recognition ==
A lithographed portrait of Harwood, by Tom Durkin is held by the National Portrait Gallery

== Family ==
Harwood is reported as having had three marriages, and at some stage he married "Margie" (c. 1843 – 5 May 1887) but only the third has been found, to Theodosia "Docy" Stewart, née Guerin, (c. 1848 – 5 December 1936), half-sister of Nellie Stewart, on 22 December 1887. They moved to New Zealand, quitting the stage almost completely. Their previous home was "Tara", 269 Albert Street, East Melbourne, which he purchased in 1884.

After his death she married again, to hairdresser and restaurateur Pierre Chamboissier ( – 27 May 1913).

His only daughter, Gwendda Muriel Harwood (22 October 1922 — 14 September 2021), married Alexander Thomas "Alick" Dick (9 February 1911 – 3 July 1982) on 18 January 1946. Dick was a veterinary pathologist and researcher with CSIRO.
