= Australasian Dramatic and Musical Association =

Friendly society in Australia and New Zealand

The Australasian Dramatic and Musical Association (ADMA) was a friendly society in Australia and New Zealand. It was founded in 1871 at the instigation of George Coppin, and initially was confined to the colony of Victoria.

Its objects were:

- 1. To provide a home for the aged and infirm
- 2. A fund for charity
- 3. A provident institution
- 4. Museum and library

The provident fund was entirely dependent on members' subscriptions; the other aspects were reliant on support from the general public.

The inaugural committee included wardens: George Coppin, Julius Siede, William Pitt, Joseph Simmons, George Chapman, Richard Capper, Lachlan McGewan, John Hennings, William S. Lyster, Henry B. Wilton, Frederick Coppin, John Dunn, and Henry Walter Scott.

A controversy arose in 1872 when the name of the Governor of Victoria (Viscount Canterbury) was removed from the free list of some theatres in the colony at the behest of the Association. It was held by the Association that his inclusion had been a courtesy extended to the Queen's representative (and his retinue) as part of a tradition which also involved a donation from the Governor's allowance to the theatre management, which this Governor had neglected to follow, as had Charles Perry the (Anglican) Bishop of Melbourne. It is more than likely that this was an impetus, if not the motive, behind the Association's formation.

Coppin went to some effort to promote membership of the Association, to the point of selectively employing actors who were members for certain productions at the Theatre Royal; in 1875 he brought an action against Ilma de Murska for singing selections from The Bohemian Girl without his permission as rights holder. She was made to pay 10 guineas into ADMA funds, plus court costs.

A Bill was passed by the Victorian Parliament in 1876 and amended in 1888, permitting the Association to set up a permanent fund for the benefit of members.

Thomas Kennedy, who died 4 June 1902, was secretary of ADMA from 1887 or earlier to 1902, and also of the Distressed Actors' Fund.

The office of "master" was held by George Coppin 1872–1877, Wybert Reeve 1887 and J. C. Williamson 1893–1905

The Association became inactive and its affairs were taken over by the Actors' Association of Australasia, based in Sydney.

A Bill was passed in 1907 which passed control of the Actors' Homes, including those at Rushall Crescent, North Fitzroy, to the Old Colonists' Association of Victoria.

The association was finally wound up in 1940 and its remaining assets transferred to the Old Colonists' Association of Victoria.
