= J. C. Lambert =

English comic actor

Joseph Charles Lambert (c. 1803 – 29 April 1875), generally referred to as J. C. Lambert, was an English comic actor who had a significant career in Australia.

== History ==
Lambert was born in Wells-next-the-Sea, Norfolk England,

He arrived in Australia around 1855, in which year he was playing in a farce, Shocking Events, at the Victoria Theatre, Sydney, although it is possible he appeared in Adelaide four years earlier.

He was a member of the consortium that leased the Theatre Royal, Melbourne 1866–1867. (Note: Barry Sullivan was sole lessee and manager of the Theatre Royal, Melbourne from March 1863 to 16 February 1866, when he played his last night and relinquished management. His last year's lease he sublet to William Hoskins, who passed it on to a consortium of Stewart, Harwood, Bellair, Vincent, Hennings, and Lambert, to be replaced in 1867 by the firm of Harwood, Stewart, Hennings, and Coppin.)

He made a speciality of playing crusty old men: Sir Peter Teazle in The School for Scandal, Sir Anthony Absolute in The Rivals Sir John Vesey in Money.

He took his farewell bows on 27 February 1868 and left Australia by the ship Reigate on 21 March.

He died at his home "Buttlands", Wells-next-sea, Norfolk, England, of a heart complaint, which he attributed to a stage accident, when a fellow thespian playfully struck him on the chest, where he had secreted a bag of pebbles, as a stage prop for a bourse of gold.
