= William Akhurst =

English born Australian actor and journalist

William Mower Akhurst (29 December 1822 – 6/7 June 1878) was an actor, journalist and playwright in Australia.

Akhurst was born in Hammersmith, London or Brook Street, Grosvenor Square, London, a son of William Akhurst (1793–1866) and Harriet Akhurst, née Dickinson (c. 1788–1869), who married in 1845. From age 14 to 26 he worked for a firm of merchants in the manchester goods, but his real interest was in performing and writing for the theatre. In 1847 he wrote two pieces for Greenwood, the manager of the Cremorne Gardens theatre: A Barber's Blunders and The Bosjemans (Bosjesmen?), both of which were successfully staged that year.

He emigrated to Australia, arriving in Adelaide by the barque Posthumous, in June 1849. and found employment as reporter and sub-editor for James "Dismal Jemmy" Allen's newly launched Adelaide Times.

He came to public attention when he assisted the widow and orphan children of a fellow journalist, who died at sea after a long illness, leaving her destitute. He gave the theatre-going public a taste of his play-writing talents with musical sketches or plays: Quite Colonial, and Romance and Reality at several of the concerts given by the Nelson family while that troupe was in Adelaide May–August 1853. A third, The Rights of a Woman, would be performed in Melbourne 24 July 1854. The songs were written by Akhurst to fit recognised tunes as played on the piano by Sidney Nelson. (Note: The troupe included Sidney Nelson, sons Alfred Nelson (died 1894) and Bobby, daughters Carry or Carrie Nelson (died 1916), Sara or Sarah and Marie, who was married to the manager Henderson.)

On 15 October 1853 he launched a newspaper, South Australian Free Press, which failed to thrive and ceased publication with the issue of 1 April 1854. This was the era of gold fever, when much of South Australia's population had left for the goldfields of Victoria and New South Wales, to the detriment of their home colony's economy. Akhurst collected what outstanding subscriptions he could, and joined the "rush". Melbourne was in its boom years, and Akhurst had no trouble finding employment; he joined the Melbourne Argus as sub-editor and music critic. Subsequently, he wrote fourteen pantomimes; one of his burlesques, the Siege of Troy, running for sixty nights, and Knights of the Round Table also popular, both starring Richard Stewart and H. R. Harwood with scene painting (in those days as much a drawcard as the acting) by John Hennings. In February 1870 he returned to England, and wrote pantomimes for Astley's, the Pavilion, and the Elephant and Castle theatres. He died on board the Patriarch, on the return voyage to Sydney.

== Works ==
- 1866 The happy delivery of a legal lady in Jolop Street East
- 1866 Gulliver on his travels, or Harlequin Old Father Christmas
- 1868 King Arthur, or The Knights of the Round Table, and
  - 1868 The Siege of Troy, burlesques written expressly for the Theatre Royal, Melbourne

Pantomimes

- Arabian Nights (1862)
- Baron Munchausen (1865)
- Gulliver on his Travels (1866)
- The House That Jack Built (1869)
- Jack Sheppard (1869)
- L. S. D. (1855)
- Little Jack Horner (1860)
- Last of the Ogres (1864)
- Robin Hood (1853)
- Robinson Crusoe (1868)
- Rule of Three (1856)
- Tom Tom, the Piper's Son (1867)
- Whittington and His Cat (1857)
- Valentine and Orson (1867)

=== Plays ===
- The Poor of Melbourne (1863)

== Family ==
In 1845 Akhurst married Ellen Tully (1824–1915), whose brother James H. Tully was a conductor at Drury Lane (or Covent Garden) theatre. Their family included:

- Adrian Charles Akhurst (1848–1927), born in England, married Christina Mitchell on 26 January 1872
- Arthur William Akhurst (1851–1907), born in Adelaide
- Sidney Philip Akhurst (24 August 1852 – 1915), born in Adelaide, married Alice Kitz on 15 January 1880
- Walter Frederick Akhurst (2 January 1854 – 6 April 1904), born in Adelaide married Kate Deutsch on 16 November 1874. He was a printer and music publisher.
- William Howard Akhurst (8 June 1858 – 15 January 1873), born 21 Brunswick Street, Melbourne, married Emilie Kate Napthaly on 4 July 1885
  - Carl Adrian Akhurst (14 June 1886 – 8 September 1953), accountant and politician
- Thomas Carlyle Akhurst (17 April 1861 – 1934), master printer, born 36 Gore Street, Collingwood, died 70 King William Street, Fitzroy
- Victor Hugo Akhurst (16 January 1863 – )
- Oscar James Akhurst (2 December 1864 – 1940)

== Sources ==
- "AustLit: W. M. Akhurst". University of Queensland.
- Graeme Skinner (University of Sydney). "A biographical register of Australian colonial musical personnel".
- William Wilde, Joy Hooton & Barry Andrews, The Oxford Companion to Australian literature, OUP, Melbourne, 1986, p. 20.
