= John Hennings =

(1835–1898) scenic artist

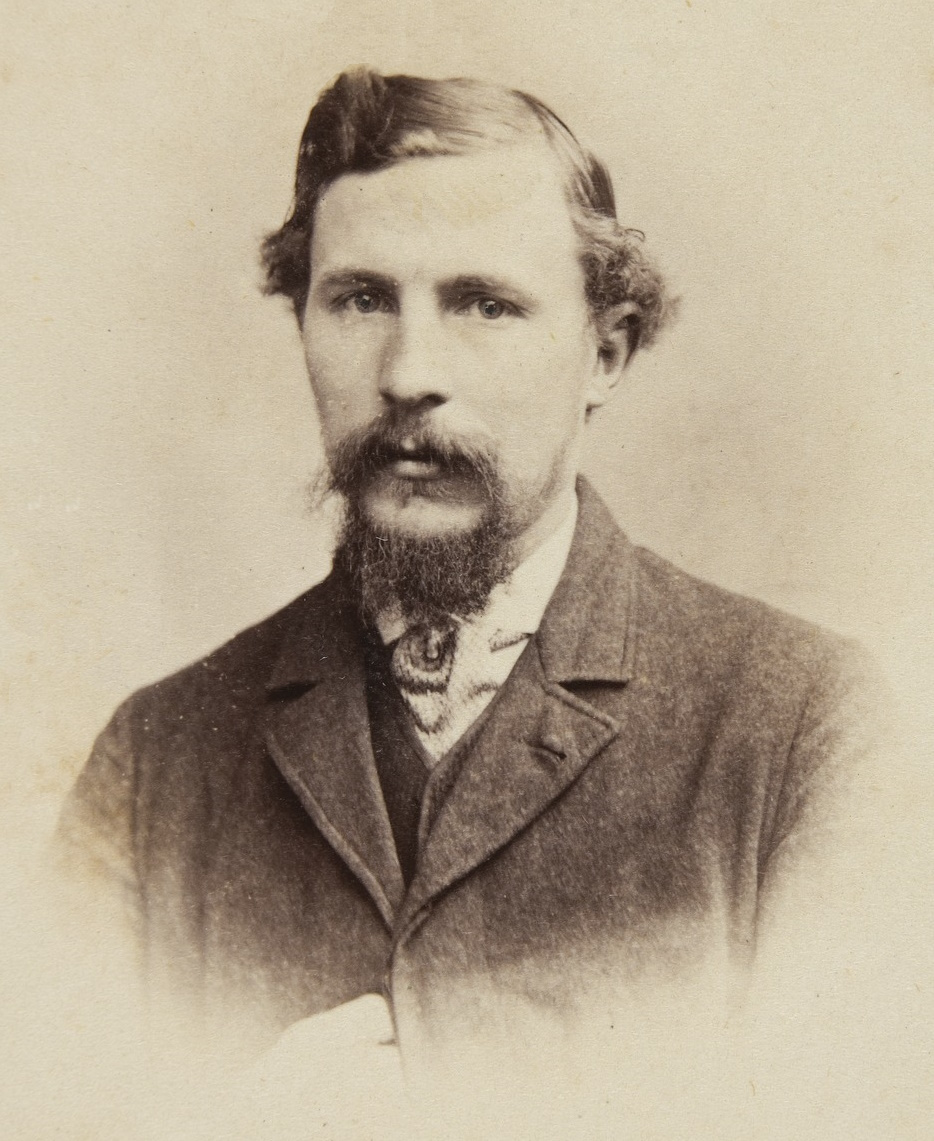
- Portrait of John Hennings (about 1869).
- Born: Johann Friederich Hennings; 6 July 1835; Bremen, Germany
- Died: 13 October 1898 (aged 63); Albert Park, Victoria, Australia
- Occupations: theatre scenic artist; artist
- Spouse(s): (1) Ellen 'Nellie' Targett (2) Elizabeth Collins (mistress)

John Hennings (6 July 1835 – 13 October 1898) was a German-born theatrical scene painter and theatre manager active in Melbourne, Australia, from the mid-1850s to the early 1890s.

During a career of over thirty-five years Hennings worked as a scenic artist in a variety of theatres, mainly in Melbourne, but also in Sydney. He worked for a number of theatre managers in productions ranging across opera, drama and pantomime. For much of his career Hennings was closely associated with the Theatre Royal in Melbourne and in 1867 he joined a consortium of actors to take over the lease of the theatre. He was involved in theatre management with various partners until the early 1880s.

Hennings' theatre scenery was popular with the public and favoured by theatrical managers. He was known for his dramatic visual imagination, attention to detail and skillful representation of perspective in the production of backdrops, panoramas and transformation scenes. Hennings' spectacular scenic designs for the various annual productions of the Christmas pantomime in Melbourne were consistently popular with the public and it become a tradition for the audience to call for the scenic artist's appearance on stage during the performances.

== Biography ==
=== Early years ===
Johann Friederich Hennings was born on 6 July 1835 in Bremen, northern Germany, to Danish-born parents, the "prominent merchant" Johann Hennings and his wife Caroline (née Schutze).^{[A]}

In about 1850, aged fifteen, Johann was apprenticed to "a decorative artist" in Düsseldorf where he "received the groundwork of the excellent art education". For a brief period he studied architectural drawing and perspective at the Düsseldorf Academy of Art, but discontinued his studies to return to decorative art. While working as a house decorator Hennings worked at localities in the "Rhine country" and later in Dresden, Prague and Vienna. Hennings specialised in the painting of flower and fruit panels. His first experience as a theatrical painter was in 1852 when he was engaged "to paint the necessary scenery for a gorgeous opera flower ballet" staged at the Kärntnertor Theatre in Vienna.

In 1854 Hennings was working in Belgrade, the capital of Serbia, but hostilities in the wider region which led to the Crimean War had caused employment difficulties. Hennings' brother had previously emigrated to Australia and on several occasions he wrote to Johann urging him to do likewise. In Hennings' words: "Finding my prospects at home to be not very brilliant, and getting no better very fast, I determined to go to Australia".

=== Melbourne ===
Encouraged by his brother, Hennings migrated to Australia. He departed from Hamburg on 22 April 1855 aboard the Neumuhlen, carrying 131 passengers, and arrived at Melbourne in the colony of Victoria on 2 August. Hennings' first job after he arrived in Melbourne was for a wool-washing facility at Richmond. Soon afterwards he found work as a draughtsman in an architect's office, "drawing and preparing land sketches".

In response to an advertisement for a scene-painter in The Argus newspaper, Hennings took his sketches and samples of work to the Theatre Royal, but was told the vacancy had been filled. It was suggested he "go up to the old Queen's Theatre", on the corner of Queen and Little Lonsdale streets, where the stage manager set him to work on a wood panel, painting "the ogre's cavern for the Christmas pantomime". This met with the stage manager's approval and Hennings was then asked to paint "a fairy scene" on canvas. The pantomime, Harlequin King Blear, and His Three Daughters (described as "a rich burlesque on Shakespeare's King Lear), opened on Boxing night, 26 December 1855. The scenery for the production was described as "to say the least, appropriate".

Know by the anglicised name of 'John', Hennings was next engaged by the theatrical entrepreneur George Coppin to join a team of scene-painters, under the supervision of William Pitt and Edward Opie, for the production of Azael, the Prodigal. The biblical drama, described as a "grand oriental spectacle", opened at the Olympic Theatre in Lonsdale Street on Easter Monday, 24 March 1856.

In August 1856 Hennings was listed as one of three scenic artists under William Pitt's supervision, employed by Coppin for a two month "dramatic season" at Melbourne's Theatre Royal in Bourke Street, featuring "the celebrated tragedian", G. V. Brooke, "for a limited number of nights". In a March 1857 review of Moncrieff's drama The Cataract of the Ganges at the Theatre Royal, the writer praised the "scenic and processional effects" of the production, adding: "It is due to the stage manager, to the costumier, property maker, and Messrs Pitt and Henning, the scenic artists, to state that all these points have been reproduced on the stage of the Royal in a manner which would not disgrace any theatre". In October 1857 Coppin and Brooke's spectacular production of Sardanapalus, a tragedy by Lord Byron, opened at the Theatre Royal. Pitt and Hennings were the scenic artists responsible for the acclaimed scenery. A reviewer in The Argus wrote that the width of the stage had been "indefinitely expanded by the far-stretching architectural perspectives which present themselves at its extreme limits". The writer described how, with "a skilled arrangement" of columns in the foreground, "and the prolongation of the pillared avenue upon canvas, the spectator obtains an impression of vastness and is the victim of a very agreeable pictorial delusion".

Hennings formed a relationship with Ellen Targett, an English-born ballet dancer, who had arrived in Melbourne in October 1857. Ellen was associated with the Theatre Royal as a dancer and actress.^{[B]}

Hennings painted the scenery for the Gougenheim sisters' production of Fortunio at Melbourne's Princess's Theatre, which opened in late December 1857. On the evening of 4 March 1858 a benefit production for Hennings and the machinist John Renno was staged at the Princess's Theatre. Much of the success of the "various burlesques and extravaganzas" recently staged at the theatre was directly attributed to the "respective talents" of Hennings and Renno. The evening's entertainment included the Pride of the Market, featuring the Gougenheim sisters, as well as "a grand pictorial representation of the Indian War, and a tableau vivant painted and arranged" by Hennings. In May 1858 Hennings' scene-paintings for The Queen of the Frogs at Princess's Theatre was described in the following terms: "Each picture is a gem, alike effective, artistic, and original".

In late 1859 G. V. Brooke leased the Theatre Royal in Melbourne, where Verdi's opera Ernani was staged in December with new scenery by Hennings. During 1860 Brooke presented a succession of Shakespearian plays at the Royal with the production of scenery under the supervision of Hennings. In April 1860 his scenery for a production at the Theatre Royal of Shakespeare's Love's Labour's Lost was described by a reviewer in The Age newspaper as "being without exception the very best we have ever seen in a colonial theatre". In December 1860 A Comedy of Errors was staged at the Theatre Royal as a benefit night for Hennings, the resident scenic artist at the theatre.

Hennings developed and maintained strong links with the German community in Melbourne. In September 1859 he painted a transparency portrait of Alexander von Humboldt, "irradiated with stars", for the German Association in Melbourne to celebrate the birthday of the German scientist and naturalist. In September 1860 a German gymnasium was opened in Russell Street, with its interior decorated with four "large and beautiful" paintings by Hennings, "illustrative of the principal rivers of Germany". In late November 1860 a festival commemorating the birth of the German poet and dramatist Friedrich Schiller was held in a large hall in the Criterion Hotel. The room was decorated for the occasion, including "a very beautiful transparency of Schiller, designed and executed by Mr. Hennings".

=== Freelance scenic artist ===
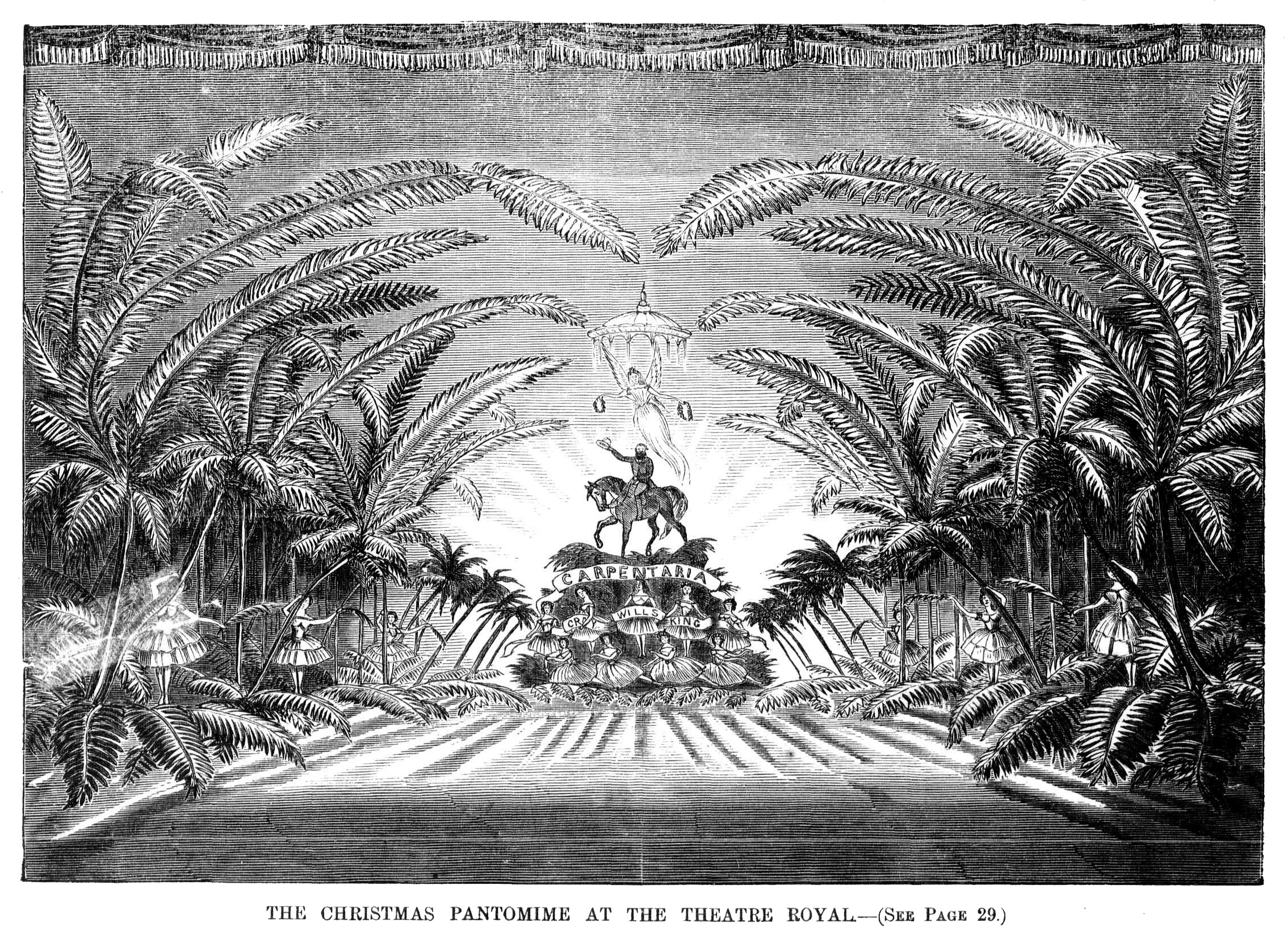
An illustration of Hennings' scenic painting for the 1861 Christmas pantomime at the Theatre Royal, commemorating the tragic Burke and Wills expedition (December 1861).

Hennings painted the scenes for the 1861 Christmas pantomime Valentine and Orson at the Theatre Royal. The closing scene of the production featured an heroic painting commemorating the expedition led by Robert O'Hara Burke to cross the Australian continent. The news of the expedition's tragic fate had reached Melbourne only six weeks previously. The centrepiece of the painting depicted a statue of Burke on horseback, set amongst a grove of fern-trees. Ballet dancers at the base held shields inscribed with the names of Wills, King and Gray. Above Burke's statue was the personification of Fame, holding wreaths of laurel over "the brave leader".

Within six years of his arrival in the colony of Victoria Hennings was widely recognised and popularly appreciated as an accomplished scenic artist, known for his attention to detail and skillful representation of perspective. A reviewer for The Argus, in describing his work for the 1861 pantomime at the Theatre Royal, wrote that "it is seldom that we find a scenic artist applying himself to his fugitive work in so conscientious and intelligent a spirit as Mr. Hennings does, or combining skill with research". Hennings growing prominence within the Melbourne theatre scene was further reinforced by the departure to Sydney in the early 1860s of the talented scenic artists, William J. Wilson and Alexander Habbe.

In early July 1862 George Coppin opened the Apollo Music Hall, in the same building as the newly-constructed Haymarket Theatre on the south side of Bourke Street. The new venue was ornamented with pictorial decorations, "principally the work of Mr. John Hennings", and "antique statuary" in the corners and niches. In October 1862 it was reported that Hennings was in charge of the decorators making alterations to the interior of the Theatre Royal.

Hennings produced new scenery for James Simmonds' production of The Enchantress (described as an "Operatic Spectacle") at the Royal Haymarket Theatre in March 1863. By July 1863 Hennings was engaged by the English actor Barry Sullivan to paint new scenery for his production of Shakespeare's As You Like It, which opened at the Theatre Royal on 1 August.^{[C]}

Hennings maintained an interest in fine art and was a member of the Victorian Society of Fine Arts. Three paintings by Hennings – 'Fruit Piece', 'View in North Germany' and 'Yarra Falls' – were included in the annual exhibition of the society which opened in March 1864 at Charles Summers' gallery in Collins Street.

In November 1865 a production of Dion Boucicault's Arrah-na-Pogue was staged at the Theatre Royal with scenery "painted in Mr. Hennings's best style". Hennings remained as the principal scene-painter at the Theatre Royal under Sullivan's management until February 1866, when Sullivan played his last night and relinquished management of the theatre. After Sullivan's departure Hennings briefly worked for Achilles King who had leased and remodelled the Princess's Theatre. By about April 1866 Hennings had joined W. S. Lyster's touring opera company and his paintings were included in the Sydney productions of Semiramide and L'Africaine.

After Sullivan's departure from the Theatre Royal, the lease was taken over by William Hoskins. In November 1866 the play Jessie, the Heroine of Lucknow was staged at the theatre with new scenery by John Hennings and William Pitt, performed in a double-bill with A Day at the Intercolonial Exhibition featuring "a magnificent new scene" by Hennings depicting "the interior of the exhibition". Hennings and Pitt painted new scenery for Hoskins for the production of A Winter's Tale at the Theatre Royal in January 1867.

=== Theatre Royal management ===
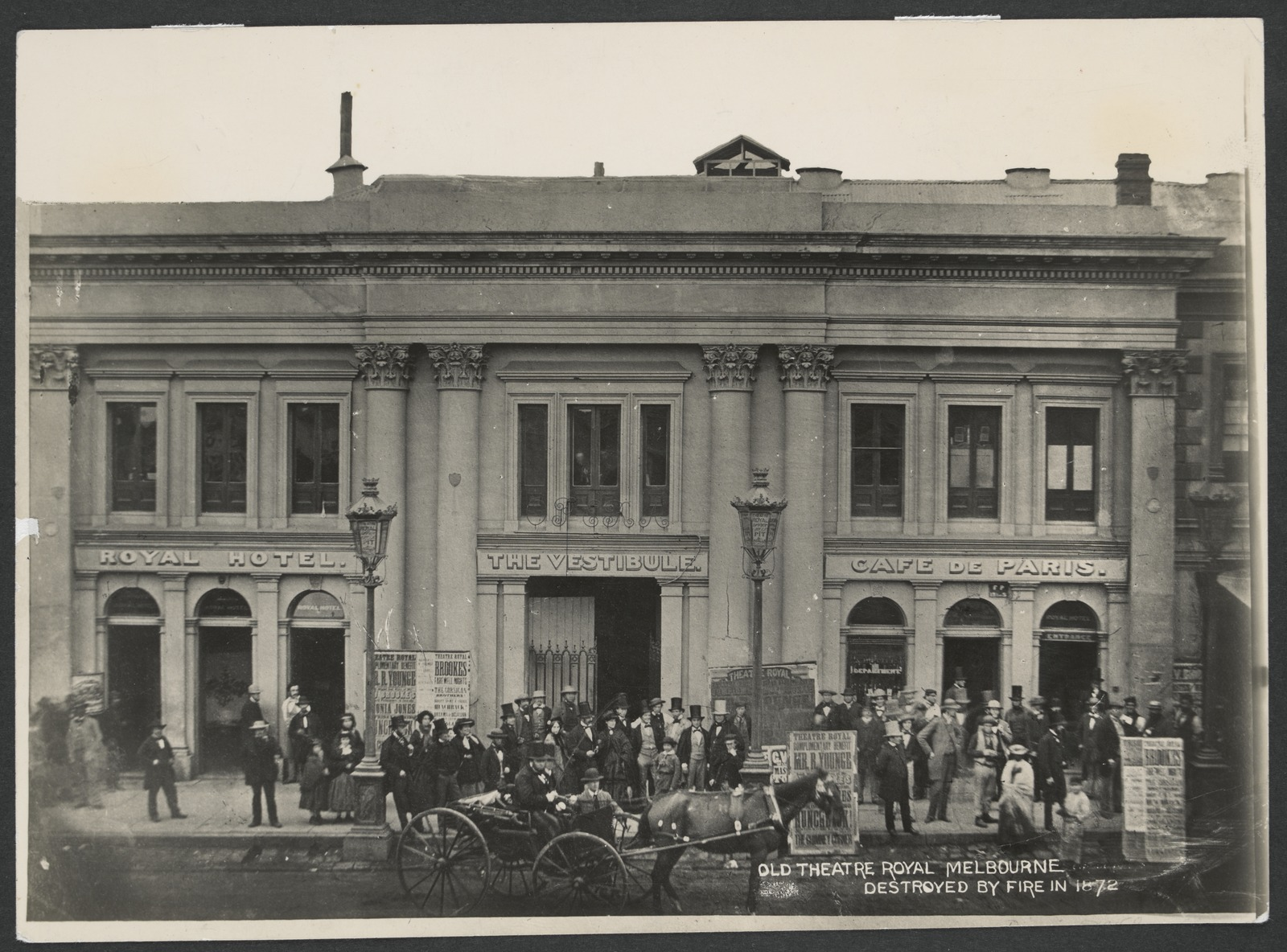
The Theatre Royal in Melbourne, photographed in 1861.

In February 1867 Hennings became involved in theatre management when he joined with five others, all actors, to take over the lease of the Theatre Royal. The consortium (described in the press as "a commonwealth of actors") was made up of Hennings, J. C. Lambert, Charles Vincent, Henry R. Harwood, T. S. Bellair and Richard Stewart. The first production under the new management was a revival of Tom Taylor's drama, The Serf; or, Love Levels All, which opened in mid-February 1867, but the play closed after several weeks and was not considered a success. Their next production, however, became "a grand success". Dion Boucicault's sporting drama The Flying Scud; or, a Four-Legged Fortune opened at the Theatre Royal on 16 March 1867. A reviewer of the play was particularly complimentary of Hennings' scene-painting depicting the Epsom Downs racecourse on Derby day, describing the scene as "one of extraordinary bustle and excitement" introducing "every possible element of the great mass of human beings who throng a racecourse". During 1867 Hennings redecorated the Theatre Royal auditorium and established a picture gallery within the lobby of the theatre.

In November 1867 the city of Melbourne greeted the visit of Prince Alfred, the Duke of Edinburgh, with a spectacular night-time display, described in The Argus newspaper in the following terms: "it is the scene of a carnival... given over to rejoicings in transparencies, loyalty in fireworks, triumph in gaslight, and a vast and overwhelming mass of people in the streets". A multitude of illuminated transparencies adorned the streets, shops and businesses of Melbourne to greet the prince. Hennings contribution to the celebrations was a transparency at the Theatre Royal, measuring thirty by twelve feet, which depicted Britannia holding a banner inscribed with the Royal arms and riding in a vehicle drawn by sea-horses, surrounded by boys holding baskets of flowers. The words "Australia's greeting" were prominent, together with other "congratulatory sentences in festooned drapery".

After Lambert returned to England in March 1868 and the death of Vincent two months later, the remaining consortium members, Harwood, Stewart and Hennings, joined with George Coppin as co-lessee's of the Theatre Royal. In 1869 the comic actor J. R. Greville took on the role of stage manager of the theatre.

Hennings contributed painted scenes to the 1870 Christmas pantomime, The Babes in the Wood, or Harlequin Robin Hood staged in the Prince of Wales Theatre in Sydney. The final scene was painted according to a model devised by the English scene-painter William Beverly in a production at London's Drury Lane Theatre. The transformation scene, occupying twenty minutes, included "eight changes, and numerous mechanical effects".

On 16 June 1871 Coppin bought out Hennings, Stewart and Harwood and assumed sole control of the Theatre Royal. With Hennings now free from his connection with the Royal he took his services to W. S. Lyster at the Princess's Theatre and began working on scenery for Offenbach's operas, Orphée aux enfers and Barbe-bleue.

In December 1871 a panorama by Hennings, a ten-scene journey across the Pacific Ocean and America from the west coast to Washington D.C., featured in the pantomime Jack and the Beanstalk at the Royal (representing Jack's journey through the world). A critic reviewing the production "emphasised the importance of Hennings' pictures over the inconsequential pantomime stories": "When in the enjoyment of this admirable array of pictures one felt most strongly how much the artist had supplanted the writer, with this as the result, that the attention of the audience is carried away from the action of a few odd and funny persons, and turned to the contemplation of scenes of beauty and grandeur which the painter has selected from nature's storehouse of wonders".

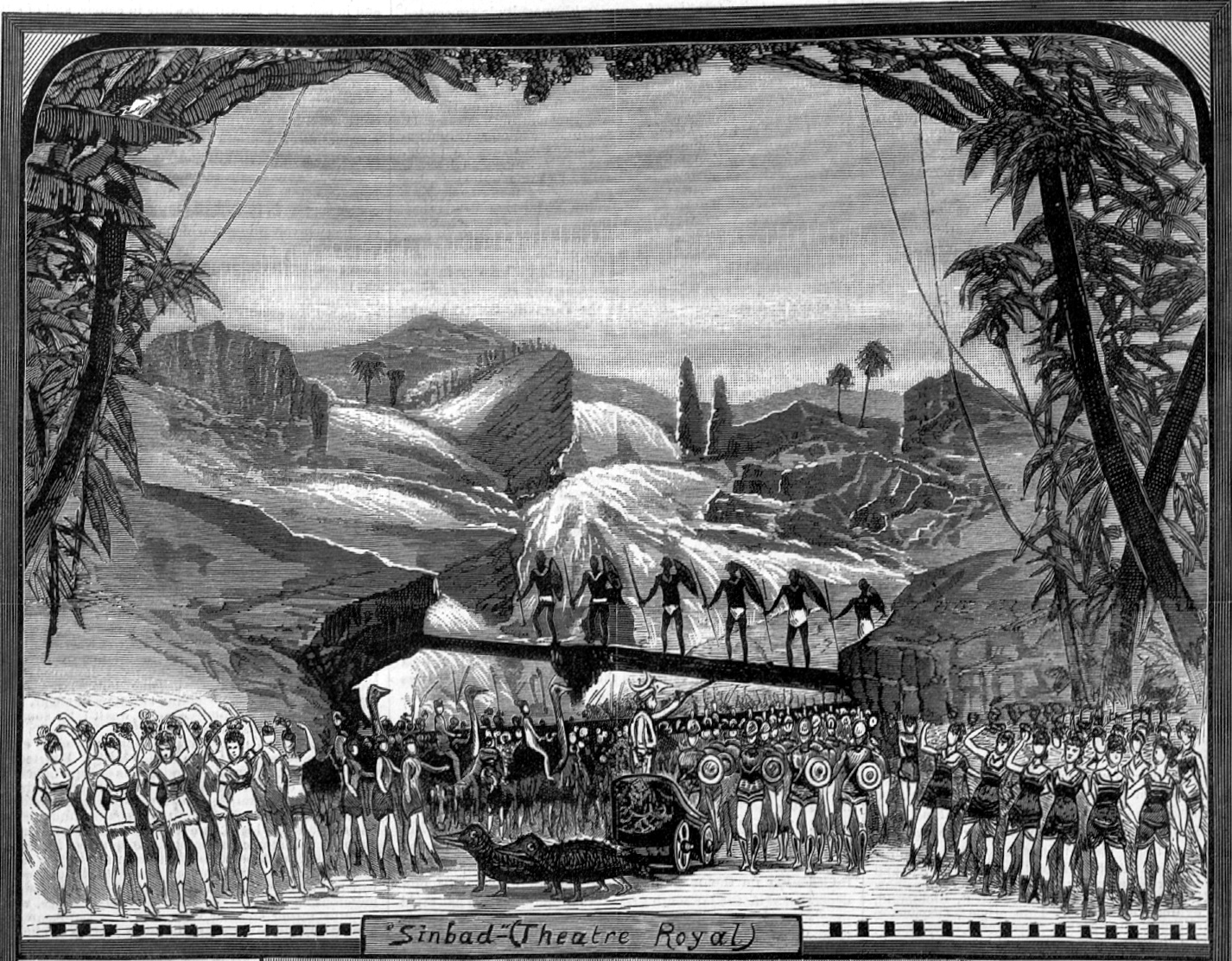
A wood engraving of a scene from Sinbad the Sailor (Theatre Royal) showing Hennings' scenic backdrop (Australasian Sketcher, 1 January 1881).

The Theatre Royal was destroyed by fire in the early hours of 20 March 1872. In June 1872 work commenced to rebuild the theatre and the partnership of Coppin, Harwood, Stewart and Hennings was reconstituted to manage the new Theatre Royal. The decorations of the new theatre were designed by Hennings who supervised a team of six to carry out the work. The domed ceiling was adorned with painted views of London (from Blackfriars Bridge) and of Melbourne (from St Kilda Road). Portraits of the actors G. V. Brooke and Walter Montgomery were placed on either side of the stage and the copy of Guido Reni's L'Aurora was painted above the stalls. The new Theatre Royal opened on 6 November 1872.

The writer Marcus Clarke used Hennings as a model for his character of 'Vandyke Brown', the scene-painter, in 'Rehearsing a Pantomime', one of twelve satirical articles collectively titled 'The Wicked World' (serialised in The Weekly Times from January to April 1874).

In October 1877 Harwood left the partnership at the Theatre Royal to return to England.

In June 1880 Hennings became a co-lessee, with George Coppin and J. R. Greville, of Sydney’s Royal Victoria Theatre in Pitt Street. The partners commenced the season with a drama set in New York, The Irish Detective, with Greville in a central role. However, their leasehold of the Victoria Theatre was short-lived, coming to an abrupt end on the night of 22 July 1880 when the theatre was destroyed by fire.

Hennings' dramatic visual imagination in the creation of backdrops, panoramas and transformation scenes for the annual Christmas pantomime in Melbourne were consistently popular and an integral part of each production and it become a tradition for the audience to call for the scenic artist's appearance on stage during the performances. His scenery was once again a feature of the Christmas pantomime for 1880, Sinbad the Sailor, at the Theatre Royal in Melbourne. Hennings and his assistant John Little, with the theatre mechanic W. H. Scott, produced a range of backdrops and moving scenery, including the "grand transformation scene" presenting "The Apotheosis of Victoria's Progress in four Decades, from 1841 to 1881, from Chaos to Splendour".

=== Later years ===
In 1882 Williamson, Garner and Musgrove took over the lease of the Theatre Royal and engaged Hennings as their scenic artist.

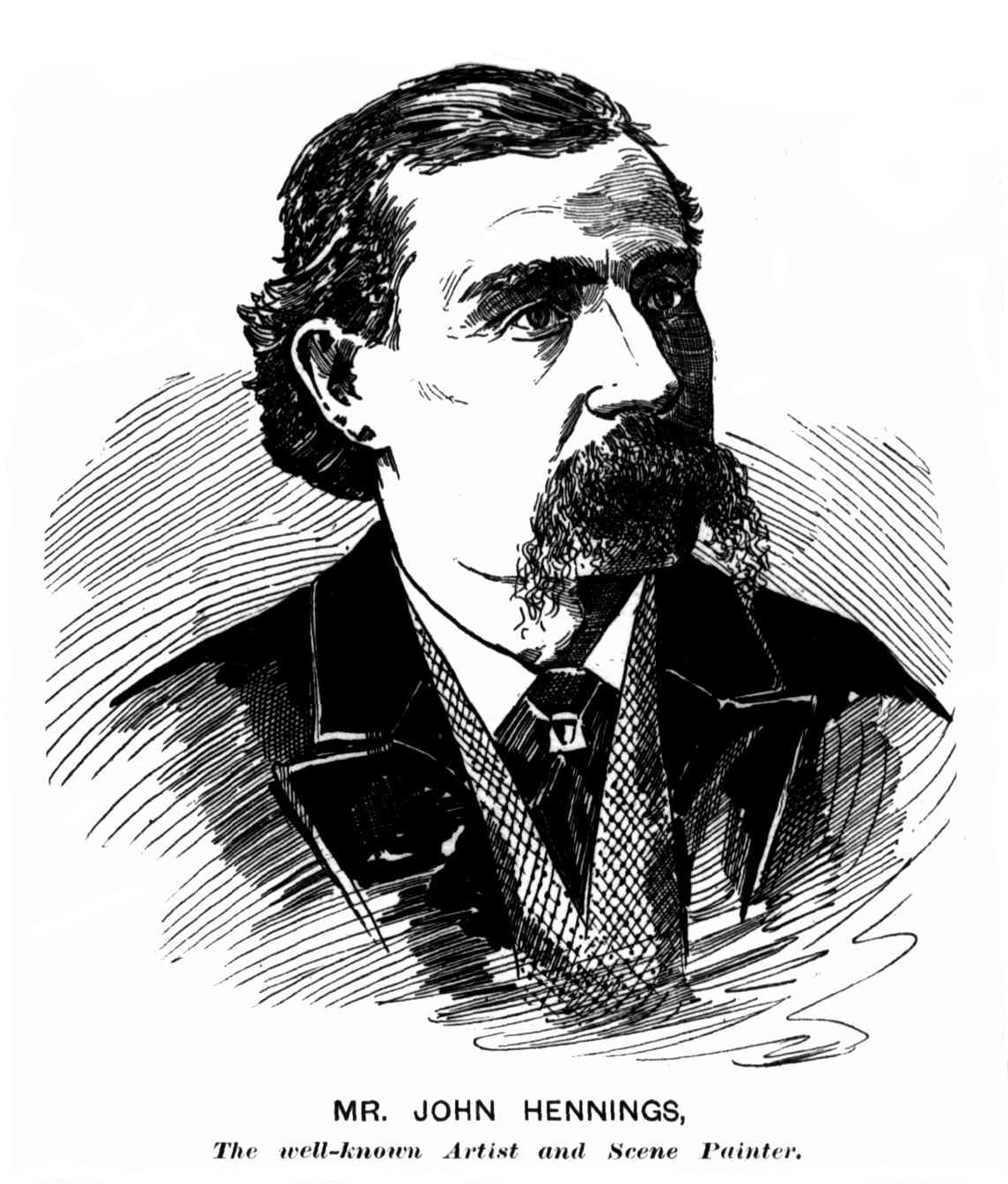
Portrait of John Hennings (Melbourne Punch, 28 March 1889).

Williamson, Garner and Musgrove's 1886 Christmas pantomime of Robinson Crusoe, written and arranged by Alfred Maltby, opened at the Theatre Royal with the scenery for the production painted by both Hennings and a younger scenic artist, John Brunton, who had recently arrived from England. The scenery was described as being "of that high artistic character which compels admiration from all classes of playgoers, the patrons of the circle joining with the gallery boys in their enthusiastic applause". By the mid to late 1880s Hennings was sharing work with a younger generation of scenic artists such as Brunton and George Gordon.

In January 1888 it was reported that Hennings had been confined to a private hospital "through a dangerous affliction with his eyesight". His medical attendant stated that "the disease is rheumatism of the optic nerve". Hennings could "still see a little" and it was expected the artist would ultimately retain his sight. In May 1888 it was reported that Hennings was further incapacitated after he fell and broke his leg. An article in The Age newspaper in early March 1889 disclosed that "within the last few years" Hennings had "lost most of his savings through investments in Fiji".^{[D]} On 23 March 1889 two separate "grand performances" were staged at the Royal and Princess's theatres for the benefit of Hennings (although the scenic artist was unable to attend either performance on the advice of his doctor).

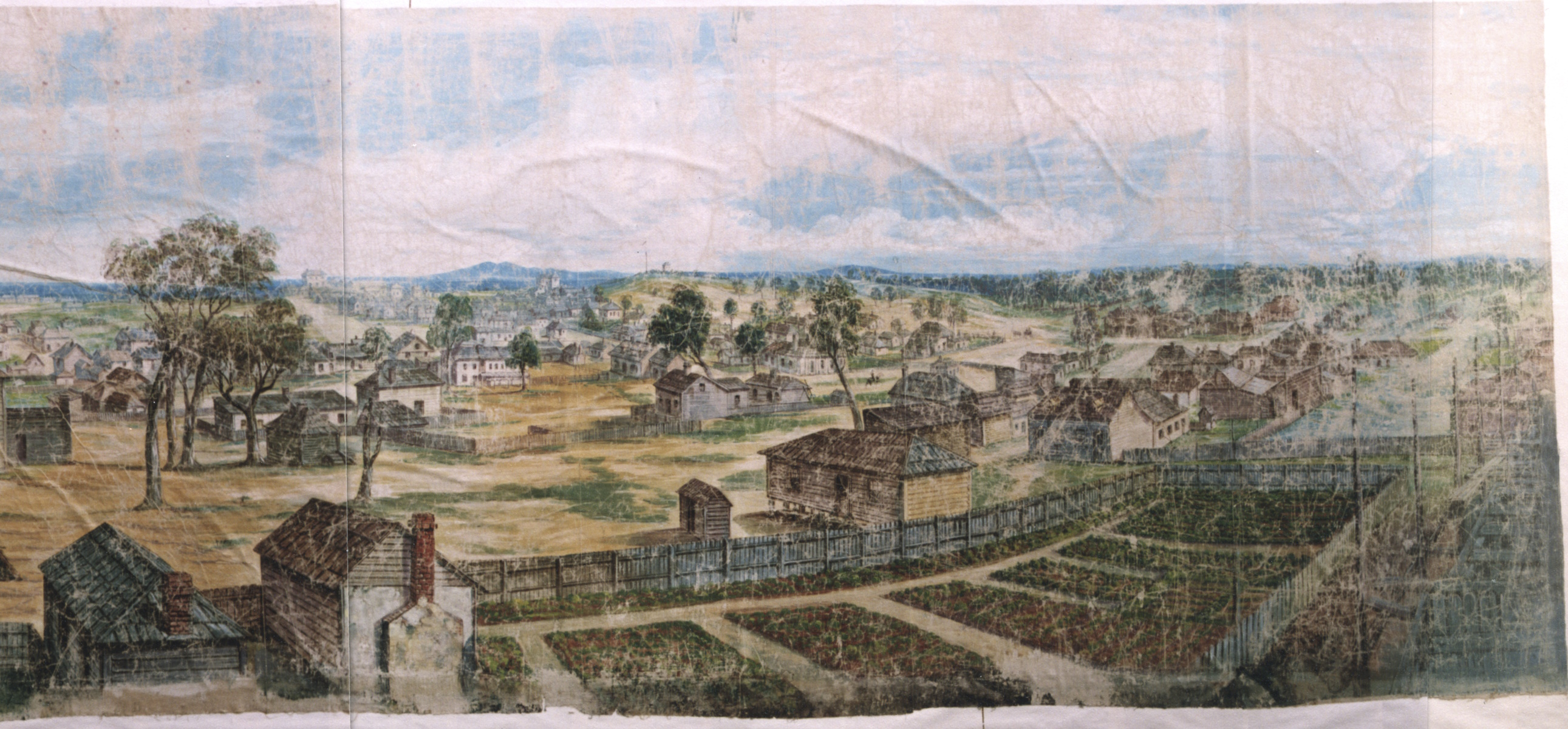
A section of the cyclorama of early Melbourne, painted by John Hennings in 1892.

In June 1889 it was reported that Hennings "is rapidly recovering from his late severe attack of illness" and had commenced working, having just completed "an Italian Lake scene, with wings, etc." for the Prahran Town Hall. In July 1889 he was engaged by Alfred Dampier to paint new scenery for a production of Hamlet at the Alexandra Theatre. Hennings painted the scenery for a revival of Antony and Cleopatra which opened at Melbourne's Her Majesty's Opera House in early November 1889.

In January 1890 the entrepreneur James Pain presented a "scenic representation" of the Great Fire of London in the Friendly Societies' Gardens in Melbourne, featuring a cyclorama of "old London in 1666" and live performances of singing and dancing (including a Maypole dance) as well as pyrotechnic effects and a firework display. Hennings was one of four artists involved in painting the "mammoth picture" (the others being Mills, Harry Grist and Fred Kneebone).

In 1892 Hennings was commissioned by the Victorian Exhibition Trustees to paint a cyclorama of early Melbourne to be displayed in the Exhibition buildings in Carlton Gardens.

Hennings died of chronic pneumonia at his home at 40 Victoria Avenue, Albert Park, on 13 October 1898, aged 63. He was buried at the Melbourne General Cemetery.

== Hennings' family ==
Although Ellen ('Nellie') Targett was referred to as John Hennings' wife, it is uncertain whether the couple were ever married.^{[B]} Whether or not Hennings and Targett were married, the couple had two children.

- Frances ('Fanny') Hennings was born in about 1858. On 27 August 1878 she married the actor Hans Phillips and the couple had three children. Frances Phillips died on 5 December 1904.
- Kitty Hennings, possibly born in 1863. In January 1880, when she was aged about seventeen, Kitty performed in a pianoforte recital at Melbourne's Eastern Market in Bourke Street. According to her father's obituary, Kitty was married by October 1898. Hennings may have been unsure of Kitty's paternity, referring to her in his will as his "reputed daughter".

By the early 1870s Hennings had formed a relationship with Elizabeth Collins, referred to as "his mistress". In 1872 in Fitzroy, Elizabeth Collins gave birth to a son, registered under the name 'John Henry Hennings Collins'. In 1912 John Henry Hennings (as he was known) was recorded as a "theatrical employee" living in Melbourne.

After John Hennings died in October 1898 it was found that his wife Ellen was not named as a beneficiary in his will. In the document Hennings left £100 to "Lizzie Collins, known as Mrs. Gardiner". He named as his executor his "reputed daughter, Florence Targett, known as Kitty Hennings". In a subsequent affidavit, his daughter Kitty denied ever being known as 'Florence Targett'.

On 24 November 1898 the theatrical fraternity of Melbourne came together to stage a benefit matinee at the Princess's Theatre in support of Hennings' widow and children. A newspaper article announcing the event stated that Ellen Hennings and her children were "left unprovided for, not through any fault of their late bread-winner's, but from a series of misfortunes, such as failing eyesight, etc., which befell him of late years". Each member of the audience received a numbered coupon and during the matinee performances numbers were drawn to win one of a selection of oil paintings and watercolours by the late artist.

'Nellie' Hennings died on 25 March 1915, aged 79, at the residence of her grand-daughter in Albert Park.

== Notes ==
A.The scenic painter, Johann Friederich (John) Hennings (1835 – 1898), the subject of this article, should not be confused with Johann Friedrich Hennings (1838 Bremen – 1899 München), a landscape painter with a considerable career in Europe.

B.In later years Ellen was referred to as Hennings' wife, but it is uncertain whether the couple were ever married as there is no record of a civil registration of marriage. In any case, Ellen Targett was professionally known as 'Miss Targett' up until January 1862 when she performed as Harlequina in the pantomime Harlequin, Valentine and Orson.

C.Barry Sullivan had been sole lessee and manager of the Theatre Royal from March 1863 to 16 February 1866, when he played his last night and relinquished management of the theatre. He then sublet the Theatre Royal to William Hoskins for the ensuing twelve months. In February 1867 Hoskins passed it on to the consortium of Stewart, Harwood, Bellair, Vincent, Hennings and Lambert.

D.The investments John Hennings made in Fiji were probably related to his brothers' businesses there. In the late 1850s Hennings' eldest brother Frederic arrived in Fiji as an agent for the German firm of J. C. Godeffroy & Co., for the purpose of commercial and plantation development on the islands. He was soon joined by two other brothers, William and Gustave Hennings. The brothers formed F. & W. Hennings, founded on credit from Godeffroys, and established stores and plantations at Levuka (on the island of Ovalau), Lomaloma (on Vanua Balavu) and on the Rewa River (on Viti Levu). Businesses were established, growing and trading in cotton, coffee, and coconut products. J. C. Godeffroy & Co. withdrew their investments from Fiji in about 1867, after which the Hennings brothers' businesses were financed by the Sydney firm of Rabone, Feez & Co. By the early 1870s the precarious financial position of the brothers became apparent, with local creditors pressing for payments. In March 1874 Rabone, Feez & Co. put F. & W. Hennings into liquidation. During the 1870s, Carl Sahl, the German Consul-General in Sydney and a managing-partner of Rabone, Feez & Co., sought ways to utilise the liquidated assets in Fiji. In 1879 he negotiated with the Colonial Sugar Refinery to grow and mill sugar-cane on the Hennings estates. Ultimately, however, the extra investment in sugar-cane production failed to recoup the losses of the previous decades, a situation exacerbated by falling sugar prices in 1890.
