= T. S. Bellair =

English-Australian actor

Thomas Smith Bellair (23 May 1825 – 14 May 1893) was an English actor who moved to Australia, where he had his own dramatic company before managing various hotels, finally settling in Wagga Wagga, where his family became prominent citizens.

== History ==
Bellair was born in Wellington, Shropshire, England, to Richard Bellair and his wife Margaret Bellair, née Gaul. He was attracted to the stage at an early age. Little has been found of his early stage career, apart from appearing at the Sunderland Theatre Royal in Newcastle in 1848 and playing Cassio in Othello at the Marylebone Theatre in London in October 1853. He married Eliza Ann Brew Newton in 1848, and had at least one child.

He arrived in Melbourne aboard the clipper ship James Baines on 27 June 1856 in company with his wife Ann, who was also an actor, actor William Hoskins, basso Robert Farquharson (died 14 February 1880), tenor Walter Sherwin (died 22 September 1881) and the pianist Linly Norman (died 16 October 1869), then continued the following day to Sydney, where he appeared under contract to Andrew Terning, lessee of the Victoria Theatre in The Road to Ruin taking the part of Barry Dornton, other players being Hoskins as Goldfinch, J. C. Lambert as Old Dornton, and Stuart O'Brien (died 23 August 1883) as Jack Milford. He was with Terning for two years, playing in Sydney and New Zealand from October 1857, when he was accompanied by his wife and infant son. In Auckland they formed a company with William Hill and leased the Theatre Royal to present Shakespeare and other classics. They returned to Australia the following year. Ann died in April 1861.

Bellair appeared in Melbourne as Gratiano in The Merchant of Venice for G. V. Brooke and George Coppin, then was co-manager with Coppin at the "iron pot" Olympic Theatre. He joined with Hoskins in Ballarat, managing the Theatre Royal, then took over as licensee of the Rainbow Hotel in Sturt Street, Ballarat from around April 1861 to July 1864.

He moved to Melbourne, where he was joint manager of the Theatre Royal with Richard Stewart, Coppin and John Hennings. In 1869 his company performed before the Duke of Edinburgh and Sir James Fergusson, Premier of South Australia. In 1869–1871 he led a company touring India, then in 1871 became licensee of the Pastoral Hotel, Flemington, which he held for 11 years. During that time he was seven years councillor on the Borough of Essendon and Flemington, and was mayor for three. He retired for a year, during which time he managed the Essendon Dramatic Club, a prominent member of which was Robert P. Whitworth (died 31 March 1901).

He moved to Wagga in 1885 and became proprietor and licensee of the Commercial Hotel (later Romano's) on the corner of Fitzmaurice and Little Gurwood streets, making valuable additions to the property. Besides his interest in the hotel, Bellair owned considerable rental property nearby: five two-storey dwellings on Gurwood Street.

He died of a heart complaint after a year's illness.

== Family ==
Bellair was married to Ann Eliza Brew Smith Bellair, née Newton (c. 1826 – 20 February 1861). She had at least one child, a son born around August 1854, with whom she made a return trip to England in 1856, both returning in time for the New Zealand assignment. Ann died in February 1861; no further details of their son have been found.

He married again on 16 December 1861, to Rachel Proud (c. 1842 – 9 November 1896). They had around ten children, including:

- Rachel Mary Fanny Bellair (c. 1862 – 10 May 1889)
- Thomas William Bellair (1864 – ) married Mary Ann Elizabeth Inglis on 2 June 1886, divorced 1897
- James Alfred Bellair (1867 – 27 January 1911) was secretary of the Murrumbidgee Turf Club. He married Jean Elizabeth "Jennie" Leonard on 12 February 1907
- George Whiteman Bellair (10 July 1868 – 14 January 1942) was licensee of the Commercial Hotel from 1909. He married Blanche Mabel "Bee" Wiseman on 8 February 1912.
- Blanche Bellair (25 August 1870 – 6 October 1944) married Frederick H. Piddington on 12 November 1890
- Richard "Dick" Bellair (19 July 1872 – ) was educated at the Grammar School, Wagga Wagga, junior member of drama club, employed by Goldsbrough Mort & Co. in Melbourne, was briefly part-owner of Albion Brewery, (Note: The Albion Brewery, on Baylis Street, Wagga, was operated by Thomas Loughlin from 1895. In February 1898 he took on Richard Bellair as partner. They made some improvements and in August 1898 sold the business to James Beattie, a local soft-drink manufacturer.) He toured his Bijou Dramatic Company through country South Australia in 1898. Nothing further has been found. (Note: Not to be confused with Richard Bellairs of Kyneton, Victoria, who played with the Florence Richter Dramatic Company and the William Anderson Dramatic Company, then with his own company. He spent a few years in Toronto, Canada, then returned to Australia, determined to present live theatre in competition with "the talkies" in Adelaide, Melbourne (presenting an Australian play, Edward Carroll's The Good Oil) and Brisbane, but was forced to disband his "New Comedy Company" in August 1930.)
- Ernest "Ernie" Bellair (9 June 1874 – 10 May 1926) succeeded his father as manager of the Commercial Hotel until 1918. He married Mabel Florence McLean ( – 4 September 1937) in 1907 or later.

- Thomas Smith Bellair (3 April 1909 – 1975)

- Ethel Bellair (12 June 1877 – 1 August 1899), who suffered from curvature of the spine, died after taking strychnine.
- Edith "Ede" Bellair (20 August 1879 – 8 June 1942) married Charles Henry Hayes on 17 June 1909, lived at Birregurra.
- youngest son John Berry Bellair (17 May 1883 – 12 November 1940) was partner in grain broking firm of Mitchell & Bellair with Angus Mitchell. He married Angus's sister Lily Mitchell on 24 June 1908.
