= Richard Stewart (actor) =

English actor

Richard Stewart (24 May 1827 – 24 August 1902) was an English stage actor who settled in Australia. He is best remembered as the father of Nellie Stewart.

== History ==
Stewart was born in South Shields, England and educated at Christ's Hospital, the Bluecoat school of West Sussex, England, where Coleridge and Lamb had been students. His full name was Richard Stewart Towzey (perhaps originally Towsey or Tousey), and despite using "Stewart" as his surname exclusively, the legal family name remained Towzey.

In 1849 he left for the goldfields of California, then in 1852 he was in Australia, at the Sofala diggings. Fortunate or not, he made his name there as an entertainer, and was given an opening as a comedian at Sydney's Royal Victoria Theatre by Gordon Griffiths. It was there he met and in 1857 married the actress and singer Mrs Guerin, a widow with two daughters Docy and Maggie. They had a daughter, Nellie Stewart of international fame, and a son Richard junior, with a long career on both sides of the stage curtain.

In 1860 he was engaged by Barry Sullivan's company in Melbourne, where he played "Myles na Coppaleen" in The Colleen Bawn, and "Lord Dundreary" in Our American Cousin, and "Uncle Pete" in The Octoroon. When Sullivan relinquished his lease on the Theatre Royal, Stewart joined with H. R. Harwood, T. S. Bellair, Charles Vincent, John Hennings, and J. C. Lambert, in taking it over. In 1867 George Coppin joined, and Bellair, Lambert and Vincent dropped out. Triumphs during this time included burlesques The Siege of Troy and Knights of the Round Table written by W. M. Akhurst and scene paintings by Hennings, with seasons in Sydney, Melbourne and Adelaide. Other successes around this time were Tobin's The Honeymoon as the "mock duke" and Dr Bowman's pantomime High, Low, Jack, and the Game during the Duke of Edinburgh's visit. Nellie Stewart, who was born in Sydney, made her first appearance as a child at the Theatre Royal during this period. Coppin bought his partners out, and was sole manager in 1872, when the theatre burned down. A new theatre was built on the site and opened in November 1872, with Harwood, Stewart, Hennings, and Coppin as proprietors.

=== World tour ===
In 1878 Stewart and his wife, Maggie, Docy, Richard jr, Nellie (then aged 15), Harry Lyons as advance agent and Harcourt Lee as conductor left Sydney with two productions, Rainbow Revels and If, or, An Old Gem Reset. They were so successful in India that Stewart decided to convert the tour to a holiday, and kept his word until they reached London, when they were persuaded to stage Rainbow Revels at the Crystal Palace on alternate afternoons for six weeks, then a season at the 14th Street Theatre, New York, for John Haverley. In September 1880 they were called back to Australia by George Coppin to stage a pantomime, Sinbad the Sailor at the Theatre Royal, Melbourne with Miss Nellie Stewart as "principal boy". The show was a roaring success, running for ten weeks, and the Stewart family was in a very comfortable position financially. Now moderately wealthy, Stewart left the stage, and apart from a brief period with Arthur Garner's London Comedy Company in Sydney, filling the hole left by the resignation of Fred Marshall, enjoyed retirement to his home in Melbourne.

=== Last years ===
The land boom of the 1880s collapsed, triggering the Australian banking crisis of 1893 and Stewart's assets, which (like Harwood's) were largely tied up in Commercial Bank stock, became worthless. He took a position as treasurer for J. C. Williamson's, which he held for five years, then worked in the same capacity for George Musgrove. Then he fell ill and, despite a medical operation, died at his residence, Evelyn Street, Fitzroy, Victoria, at the age of 75.

== Family ==
Mrs Guerin, née Theodosia Yates (12 April 1815 – 19 July 1904) was a great-granddaughter of actors Richard Yates and Mary Ann Yates, and came to Australia in 1840 for Anne Clarke. She had previously married Alexander Macintosh, but used the stage name "Mrs Stirling". She married James Guerin (21 October 1814 – 9 March 1856), orchestral conductor in Anne Clarke's Opera Company, in August 1846 and had at least two daughters by him:

- Theodosia "Docy" Guerin (c. 1848 – 5 December 1936) later adopted the stage name Docy Stewart, and appeared with Eduardo Majeroni, among others. She married three times: on 31 December 1869 to James Collins, who was not attached to the theatre, then Henry R. Harwood (1830 – 16 April 1898), his third marriage; they moved to New Zealand, quitting the stage almost completely. She married again, to hairdresser and restaurateur Pierre Chamboissier ( – 27 May 1913).
- Margaret Elizabeth "Maggie" Guerin (1852 – 30 September 1903) appeared as Maggie Stewart in Siege of Troy and Rainbow Revels, but never reached the level of her siblings Docy and Nellie, and ceased appearing on stage around 1885. She died after some months of pain at her mother's residence, 251 Victoria Parade, East Melbourne.

James Guerin died in 1856 and Stewart married his widow in 1857. They had two children:

- Eleanor "Nellie" Stewart (20 November 1858 – 21 June 1931), "Sweet Nell", Australia's first internationally-known musical celebrity.
- Richard Stewart (1861 – c. February 1943) married Constance "Katherine" Deorwyn (1860 – 29 July 1942), daughter of actor John Hayward Deorwyn (c. 1823 – 6 August 1888) and sister of Alice Deorwyn, who married Charles Holloway. They had a home at 515 New South Head Road, Double Bay. Children were Hermione Theodosia Constance Towzey and Kenneth Richard Henry Towzey but generally known as Mione Stewart (later Denver) and Ken Stewart. He was educated at Scots College and was with "The Firm" of J. C. Williamson's as comic actor, then manager of their New Zealand operations from before 1900 to 1913, followed by South Africa, then Her Majesty's Theatre, Sydney to 1921 followed by the Criterion Theatre, Sydney.
