= Theodosia Stirling =

Australian stage actor and opera singer

Theodosia Yates Stirling (1815 – 19 July 1904) was a contralto singer who had a considerable career on the Australian stage as, successively, "Mrs Stirling", "Mrs Guerin", and "Mrs Stewart". She is perhaps best known as the mother of Nellie Stewart.

== Career ==
Stirling was an actor and singer of some note in London before leaving for the colonies in a company recruited by Anne Clarke to perform at the Theatre Royal, Hobart, Tasmania, in 1841–42, alongside Jerome Carandini, John Howson and Frank Howson of the celebrated Howson family, and was engaged there for three years. She was described as the prima donna of the Theatre Royal in Tasmania. She and Clarke supplemented their modest door takings by offering musical tuition.

She left Tasmania in 1845 and initiated a successful career as an actor and opera singer in Sydney, where she was engaged at the Victoria Theatre. In 1846, she played Arline in Michael Balfe's The Bohemian Girl, which became one of her better-known roles. She was one of few female singers regarded to be able to rival the prima donna Marie Carandini, and their rivalry onstage was reported in the press.

After leaving her engagement in Sydney, she started a famed travelling family company with her third husband, which toured Australia and India and in which she played a leading part. They were referred to as the "first family of the Australian stage".

== Personal ==
Theodosia Yates was a great-granddaughter of the famous actor and actress Richard Yates and Mary Ann Yates. She is recorded as having been married to one Alexander Macintosh, and used the name "Macintosh" in some documents, but went by the stage name "Mrs Stirling" until 1846, when she married the musician James Guerin. They had two daughters, Theodosia and Margaret who would become well known as Docy and Maggie Stewart. Guerin died in 1856 and the following year she married the actor Richard Stewart and had two children, Nellie Stewart and Richard Stewart, jun.

Stirling died at her home, 251 Victoria Parade, East Melbourne on 19 July 1904 and was buried in Boroondara Cemetery, Kew. Her third husband, Richard, predeceased her on 24 August 1902.
