= Charles Frederick Young =

Actor, comedian and theatrical manager

Charles Frederick Horace Frisby Young (5 April 1819 – 29 January 1874) was an Australian actor, comedian and theatrical manager. Young was born in Doncaster, Yorkshire, England, and died in Woolloomooloo, New South Wales.

== See also ==
- George Selth Coppin
- John Thomas Smith
- Gustavus Vaughan Brooke
- Thomas Barry Sullivan
- Walter Montgomery
- Duke of Edinburgh
