= Stuart O'Brien (stage) =

Stuart O'Brien (1833 – 25 August 1883) was an Irish-born actor and manager in Australia.

== History ==
Francis Stuart O'Brien was born in County Tipperary, Ireland, and was brought to England as a child. In 1851 he left for America, and began acting professionally with J. W. Wallack's company, briefly adopting the stage name Frank Stuart. He arrived in Victoria, Australia in 1854, and did not appear on stage for a year or so, then in 1856 he joined H. T. Craven and W. H. Stephens at the Lyceum Theatre, Sydney in a company that included G. V. Brooke, Robert Heir (died 27 February 1868) and Mrs. Robert Heir (a.k.a. Fanny Cathcart), James Milne, Francis Belfield (died 13 April 1883), Mrs. Crosby (Mrs. Eigenshank), Harry Edwards, E. Wright, W. H. Walker, R. P. Whitworth, Mrs. Winterbottom, Miss Amy Howard and Mrs H. T. Craven.

He founded his own troupe, touring the New South Wales goldfields and New Zealand then returned to Victoria, where he was a popular favorite. He later became joint lessee of the Princess Theatre, Melbourne with the scenic artist Harry Holmes, a financial failure for them both.

He was noted for playing "Job Armroyd" in Watts Phillips' Lost in London and "Deacon Skinner" in Struck Oil . One of his last parts was as "Donald McAlister" opposite Jennie Lee in The Grasshopper (Note: "The Grasshopper", adapted by her husband J. P. Burnett from the French La Cigale by Ludovic Halévy and Henri Meilhac) in 1882.

He was for many years a warden of the Australasian Dramatic and Musical Association.
