= Queen's Theatre, Melbourne =

Queen's Theatre
- Address: Corner of Queen and Little Bourke St; Melbourne; Australia

Construction
- Opened: 21 April 1845
- Demolished: 1922

The Queen's Theatre was a playhouse in Melbourne, the capital of Victoria, Australia. Situated on Queen Street, it was Melbourne's first purpose-built venue for staging plays, musicals and opera.

== History ==
Originally named the Queen's Theatre Royal, it was located on the north-east corner of Queen and Little Lonsdale streets or the south-west corner of Queen and Little Bourke streets. It was built for councillor, later mayor John Smith, licensee of the Adelphi Hotel in Little Flinders Street and the architect was Charles Laing. It was opened on 21 April 1845 with a drama Bear Hunters (or) The Fatal Ravine. The first manager was the actor Francis Nesbitt.

Mr and Mrs George Coppin made their Australian debut there in 1845, in Edward Bulwer-Lytton's The Lady of Lyons.

Johnny Hydes and Charles Young were joint lessees 1849–1854, then Young alone in 1855.

G. V. Brooke made his first stage appearance in Australia at the Queen's Theatre in February 1855, playing Othello. The theatre proved too small, and while in Melbourne he laid the foundation-stone for the Olympic Theatre, on which stage he made his return appearance, later leasing the Theatre Royal in partnership with George Coppin.

The building was demolished in 1922.
