= Charles Vincent (theatre) =

English actor and stage manager

Charles Vincent (1823 – 10 May 1868) was an English actor with a career as actor and stage manager in Australia, where he died when an apparently innocuous injury turned septic. He was married to the actress Louise Cleveland.

== History ==
Vincent, (real name Charles Panrucker Viner) was brought up destined for a career in the Church, but his interests lay in the theatre. He came to public attention when as a member of an English company playing a series of Shakespeare's plays at the Theatre Imperial, Paris, he received a great deal of praise, notably from Lemaître. He was playing at the Drury Lane theatre and his wife, "Miss Cleveland" was at the Strand theatre, when they were approached by John Black, who built the Theatre Royal, Melbourne, to appear in a series of plays in Australia.

== Australia ==
On 27 February 1864 they made their first appearance on the Melbourne stage with the drama Leah, or The Forsaken, adapted from Mosenthal's Deborah. Cleveland acted in the name part and Vincent as Nathan, both receiving excellent notices. They took the play to other Australian colonies and to New Zealand, everywhere to good houses, returning to Melbourne in July.

Other parts for which he was noted were Philip Faulconbridge in King John, Macbeth, Hamlet's father, and Joseph Surface in The School for Scandal.

=== Manager ===
When William Hoskins became lessee of the Theatre Royal, Ballarat, in 1865, Vincent and Cleveland moved too, and when J. C. Lambert became lessee of the Theatre Royal, Melbourne, Vincent took on the duties of stage manager, at which he excelled, being reckoned second only to Barry Sullivan in that function. And when Lambert quit as lessee-manager in February 1868, Vincent took on those duties as well.

=== Last days ===
Vincent was in the yard of their residence on Palmer-street, Fitzroy, on 1 May 1868, and went to mount his horse, bareback, when the horse shied away, throwing him to the ground. He got to his feet, having apparently suffered nothing more than a sore back and badly dislocated thumb. No fears were held for his well-being, but two days later the thumb injury had spread in the form of erysipelas to the shoulder and by 7 May he had become delirious and the consulting doctors advised him to finalise his affairs which, being perfectly conscious, he was able to do. His wife, John Hennings and friend James Hosie were with him when he died. The funeral took place on 12 May and his remains were buried at the Melbourne General Cemetery.

== Personal ==
Vincent married Louise Cleveland (c. 1834–1902), professionally known as Miss Cleveland, in 1856. After his death she used "Mrs Viner" professionally, as when she was praised for her role as Marion Holcombe in an adaptation of Wilkie Collins's The Woman in White.

Cleveland later married the tragedian Arthur Stirling, the aftermath of which filled the gossip columns for weeks.
