= South Australian Free Press =

The South Australian Free Press was a weekly newspaper published in Adelaide, South Australia from 15 October 1853 – 1 April 1854. Its slogan was "A champion never out of mail". (Note: i.e. One who will fight for a cause and never remove their armor)

Originally of 12, later 16 pages, and priced at 6d (six pence) a copy, it was published on Saturdays.

With the discovery of gold in Victoria and New South Wales, and the consequent exodus of workers to the goldfields, the economic climate of South Australia in the 1850s was not conducive to new enterprises, and the newspaper failed to thrive. The publisher and editor W. M. Akhurst joined the rush to Melbourne and never looked back.

The paper was controlled by a committee of shareholders and Akhurst was editor from the start. It was initially printed by Henry Hilton and Charles Edlin of Hindley Street, and published from an office over Colley's newsagents, King William Street, Adelaide, but from 5 November 1853 or earlier, was both published and printed from premises on King William Street, opposite the Gresham Hotel.

== Digitization ==
The National Library of Australia has digitized microfilmed copies of several issues from No.3 of 29 October 1853 to No.8 of 3 December 1853 and all from No.21 of 4 March 1854 to No.26 of 8 April 1854.
