= Linly Norman =

English pianist and conductor

Alfred Linly Norman (c. 1836 – 16 October 1869), known as Linly (very frequently mis-spelled as "Linley") Norman, was an English pianist and conductor who had a career in Australia before dying at an early age.

== History ==
Norman studied piano under Sir George Smart and subsequently enrolled with the Royal Academy, graduating with honours. He took further studies under Felix Mendelssohn, whose first six books of Lieder ohne Worte he was able to play perfectly from memory.

He arrived in Melbourne aboard James Baines in June 1856 as musical director of the English Opera Company with William Hoskins and his wife Julia Harland.

He returned to Australia in 1861, living and teaching in Adelaide for five years, before moving to Tasmania. He died at the Union Hotel, Launceston, Tasmania, from a cerebral haemorrhage and his remains were buried at the local Church of England cemetery.

He was reckoned by the critic "Autolycus" as the first eminent pianist to visit Victoria, and whose only fault was an excess of humility.

== Selected appearances ==
- 20–25 November 1864 at White's Rooms, Adelaide at a "Monster Festival" featuring "Over one hundred performers — all the available talent, amateur and professional, in South Australia"
- 13 September 1869, at the Mechanics' Institute hall, Launceston, a concert by the Young Men's Mutual Improvement Association, his last public appearance.
