= Haymarket Theatre, Melbourne =

The Haymarket Theatre, or Royal Haymarket Theatre was a live theatre built by George Coppin in the Haymarket district of Melbourne, Australia in 1862 and was destroyed by fire in 1871.

== History ==
The theatre was built on 1.5 acres (0.61 ha) on the south side of Bourke Street, extending through to Little Collins Street, and opened in 1862. Conlan was the architect and Cornwall the builder. The building incorporated the Apollo Music Hall, which opened on 5 July 1862 with a programme that featured Madame Carandini.

The theatre proper was opened on 15 September 1862 with the play Our American Cousin.

It was renamed the Duke of Edinburgh Theatre in January 1868 in honour of the visit of Prince Alfred, Duke of Edinburgh, but remained the "Haymarket", informally at least.

It was destroyed by fire on the evening of 22 September 1871. The building had been closed for some months owing to a dispute between the leaseholders and the trustees.

== Managers ==
(as Haymarket Theatre)

- James Simmonds: 1862–April 1864 (also lessee/manager of Royal Princess's Theatre) relinquished due to insolvency.
- William Hoskins: 1864–1866. He went on to manage the Theatre Royal
- Foley: 1866 The nadir of his brief incumbency appears to have been the night of a "conundrum quest", "pig fight" and "kangaroo hunt".
- George Coppin: 1866–April 1867

(as Duke of Edinburgh Theatre)

- Spiller and Marsh: 1867–1868. Insolvent, "to nobody's surprise"
- Gilbert Roberts: September 1868 – January 1869, also insolvent. It was during this period that Charles Summers' bust of G. V. Brooke was controversially unveiled at the theatre, before its removal to the Public Library.
