= William Hoskins (actor) =

English Shakespearean actor (1816-1886)

- Born: 17 February 1816; England, United Kingdom
- Died: 28 September 1886 (aged 70); Melbourne, Victoria, Australia
- Occupation: Actor

William Hoskins (17 February 1816 – 28 September 1886) was a English Shakespearean actor whose later career was mostly in Australia and New Zealand, reputedly "one of the best actors who has ever trod our stage".

== Biography ==
Hoskins was a son of Abraham Hoskins, a wealthy attorney of "Newton Park" in Newton Solney, Derbyshire and was originally destined for a career in Law, to which end he studied at Cambridge, but was attracted to the theatre and "dropped out" at some stage.

He first appeared on stage at the Southampton Theatre in 1835, then after years of experience in provincial theatres made Covent Garden Theatre on the 13 October 1843, in Dion Boucicault's comedy London Assurance, as Charles Courtley. Another report has him joining a provincial touring company in 1834.

In 1837, with financial support of his father, who preferred his son to be in management, he took over Worthing Theatre, but lost his money and returned to acting.

In 1846 Mrs Mary Warner, Samuel Phelps and scene painter T. L. Greenwood (1806–1879), took the lease of Sadler's Wells Theatre, dedicated to performance of First Folio Shakespeare, and Hoskins was one of their first recruits, specializing in comedy parts. His first appearance for Phelps was as "Poins" in Henry IV, Part 1 on 25 July 1846. On 4 November 1846 he first played "Lucio" in Measure for Measure, the part in which, said Phelps, "he was without rival in this theatre." He went on to play "Modus" in Knowles's The Hunchback, "Gratiano", in The Merchant of Venice, "Guiderius" in Cymbeline, "Slender" in The Merry Wives of Windsor, and "Roderigo" in Othello. The John Tallis Complete Works of Shakespere edited by Phelps includes a portrait of Hoskins as "Touchstone" in As You Like It.

He had a small but possibly significant part in the history of English theatre, as elocution coach to a young actor named Brodribb who seemed to show great promise, and shortly before leaving for Australia gave him a letter of introduction to his friend Edward D. Davis, manager of the Lyceum Theatre, Sunderland, which became a small step on Henry Irving's path to lasting fame.

=== Australia ===
Hoskins arrived in Melbourne aboard the James Baines on 27 June 1856 under contract to John Black in company with basso Robert Farquharson (died 14 February 1880), tenor Walter Sherwin (died 22 September 1881) and the pianist Linley Norman (died 16 October 1869). He was met by his brother Horatio Huntly Hoskins, a solicitor with a practice in Talbot, (Note: Known as Huntly Hoskins (died 6 July 1876), he was also an actor, poet and playwright, whose published plays include Count De Denia, or, The Spaniard's Ransom (1841) and De Valencourt: A Tragedy in Five Acts (1842, written with his brother). He was the owner of several good horses, notably Nimblefoot, and gambled heavily, to his detriment, and was proven insolvent in 1871. He attended Harland in her last days.) then continued the following day to Sydney, where he first appeared on 7 July 1856 at the Victoria Theatre as Goldfinch in The Road to Ruin, other players being J. C. Lambert (died 30 April 1875) as Old Dornton, T. S. Bellair as Barry Dornton; and Stuart O'Brien (died 25 August 1883) as Jack Milford. (another advertisement had his first appearance on 28 July 1856 as "Colonel Jack Delaware" at the "English Opera House" (Royal Lyceum, Sydney) in the farce Fast Train! ..., initially accompanying Bellini's opera La Sonnambula, performed by the Grand English Opera Company). In October 1856 he appeared in Queen's Theatre, Melbourne and in 1857 toured the goldfields.

In January 1860 Hoskins announced the opening of the Theatre Royal, Ballarat a week hence, touting in Melbourne for actors and musicians to perform therein, offering "liberal treatment" to "stars". No mention was made of production or rehearsals; presumably the "stars" were expected to perform their "party pieces". He left Ballarat a year later, and with Clarance Holt leased Melbourne's Theatre Royal in 1861–62. Hoskins was lessee/manager of the Royal Haymarket Theatre 1864–1867 and, briefly, the same theatre renamed the Duke of Edinburgh in January 1868.

He moved to New Zealand around 1870, and in 1874, his wife having died in 1872, he married his leading lady; they then left for London. He returned to Melbourne in 1880, where he was accorded a complimentary benefit.

He retired from the stage on 19 December 1884, taking his last bow at the Theatre Royal, Melbourne in Colman's comedy The Heir at Law. After making a farewell speech he was presented with a purse of sovereigns by George Coppin.

Hoskins died in Melbourne, and at a benefit performance held six months later at the Princess's Theatre for his widow and child, a message and contribution of 100 guineas was received from Sir Henry Irving, whom he had befriended some thirty years earlier.

== Personal ==
Hoskins married the singer and actress Julia Harland (born Julia Wallack) in England on 24 August 1842. Harland, was a sister of actor-manager Lester Wallack and daughter of actor Henry John Wallack, accompanied Hoskins to Australia, but remained in Australia when he left for New Zealand. She died 19 August 1872.

Hoskins married again, in January 1874 in Christchurch, New Zealand, to Florence Mary Rice (known professionally as "Miss Florence Colville"), an actress who was with his troupe from 1870.
