= Barry Sullivan (English actor) =

19th-century British actor

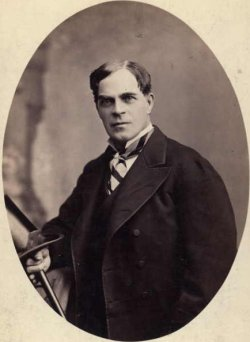

Barry Sullivan (christened Thomas Barry Sullivan; 5 July 1821 – 3 May 1891), was an acclaimed stage actor who played many classical parts in England, Australia and America.

== Early life ==
Thomas Barry Sullivan was born at Howard's Place, Birmingham, Warwickshire, England, son of Peter and Mary (née Barry) Sullivan, both natives of Cork, Ireland. Thomas Barry was orphaned at eight years old.

Sullivan was then raised by his paternal grandfather in Bristol. Sullivan was educated initially at the school attached to the Catholic Church in Trenchard Street and then at the Stokes Croft Endowed school. At 14 years old, Sullivan entered a lawyer's office, but, seeing William Macready in Macbeth and other parts, he became obsessed with the idea of becoming a great actor.

== Early acting career ==
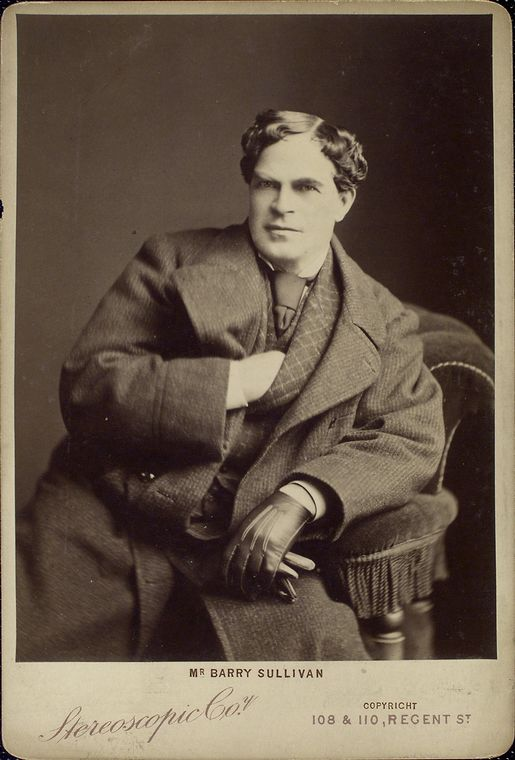
Barry Sullivan during his career.

In 1837, Sullivan joined a strolling company and at Cork was given an engagement at 15 shillings a week as a regular member of a stock company, playing minor Shakespearian parts to Charles Kean's lead. Sullivan had a good light tenor voice, occasionally sang in opera. But his ambition was to become a tragedian. In November that year he obtained an engagement with Murray's stock company at Edinburgh, at a salary of 30 shillings a week, on the understanding that he was to play "second heavy" parts. Sullivan married Mary Amory, daughter of an army lieutenant, on 4 July 1842. The couple had two sons and three daughters.

Sullivan soon began to play leading roles, in 1844 he took the part of Antonio supporting Helena Faucit in The Merchant of Venice and was Petruchio to her Katharina in The Taming of the Shrew. Sullivan then went to Glasgow where he met and acted with Gustavus Vaughan Brooke; during the next seven years had engagements throughout the provinces in Scotland and England. James Roland MacLaren learnt acting through being an understudy to him in the North of England. Sullivan's reputation was growing, and on 7 February 1852 he made a successful first appearance at the Haymarket Theatre, London, as Hamlet. He was also successful as Angiolo in Miss Vandenhoff's Woman's Heart, Evelyn in Lord Lytton's Money and Hardman in Lytton's Not so Bad as we Seem.

Sullivan was now established as a leading actor and played principal parts during the next eight years in most of the plays of the period including Claude Melnotte in The Lady of Lyons with Helena Faucit as Pauline, and Valence in Browning's Colombe's Birthday, with Helena Faucit in the part of Colombe.

Towards the end of 1858 Sullivan went to the United States of America, and opened at the Old Broadway Theatre in New York City on 22 November in Hamlet, followed by several others of Shakespeare's plays. Successful seasons were played at the leading cities in the United States and Sullivan returned to England 18 months later. At the St James' Theatre, London, in August 1860, Sullivan played on alternate nights, Hamlet, Richelieu, Macbeth, and Richard III, three performances being given of each play.

== Career in Australia ==
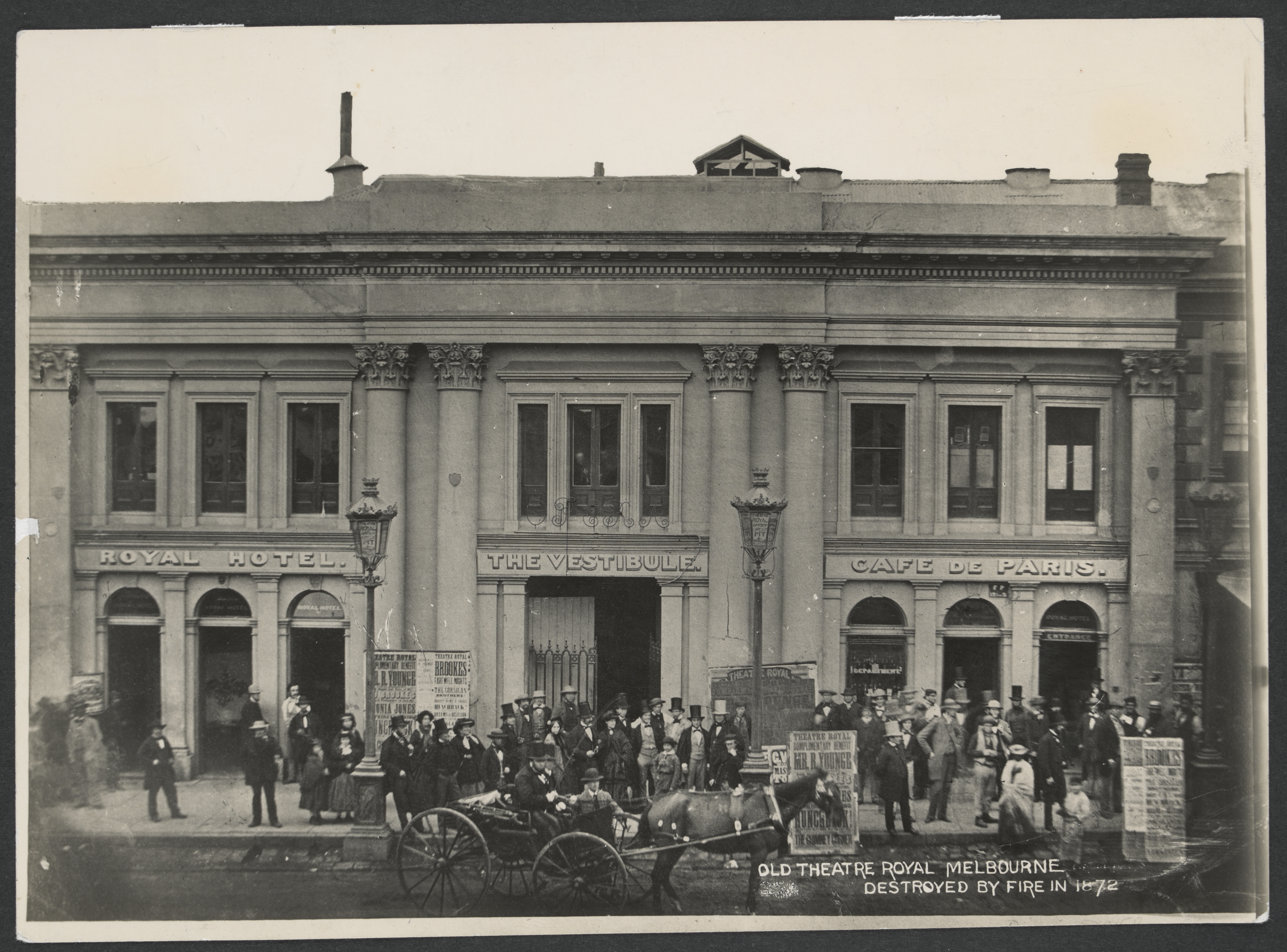
Theatre Royal, Melbourne

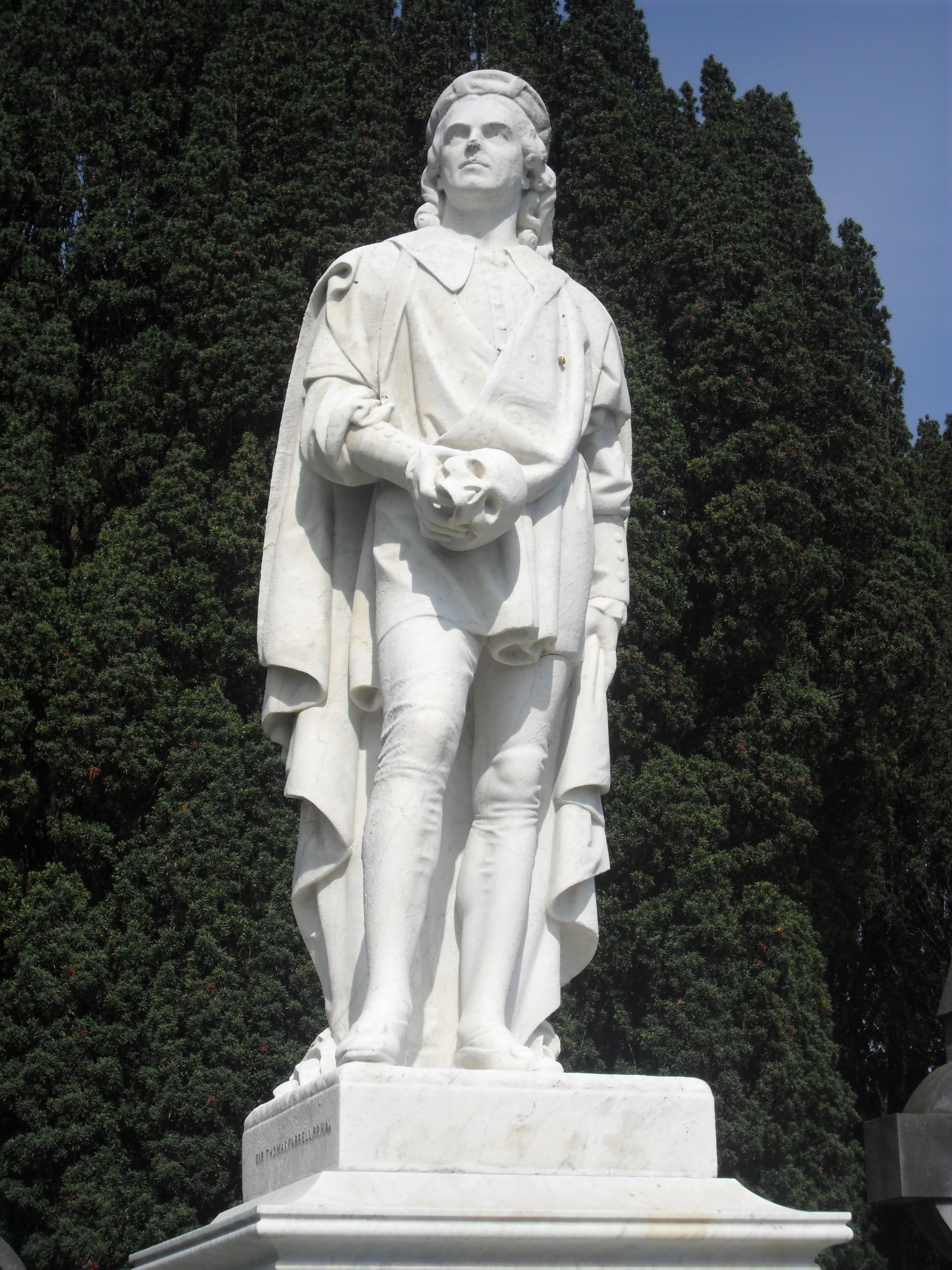
Sullivan's burial site in Glasnevin Cemetery, Dublin, with a statue of Sullivan in character as Prince Hamlet.

On 25 July 1862 Sullivan arrived in Victoria (Australia) aboard the City of Melbourne and was to stay for about four years, as actor and manager. Sullivan made his début as Hamlet at Theatre Royal, Melbourne on 9 August 1862.

The period between 1860 and 1870 was one of the highest standards of acting seen in Australia. Brooke was usually at his best in Australia, Joseph Jefferson was at his best and had not yet begun to restrict the range of his characters, and Sullivan had the advantage, sometimes lacking later in England, of always having excellent support from his companies. Sullivan's parts in Australia included Hamlet, Othello, Iago, Richard III, Macbeth, Shylock, Lear, Falstaff, Falconbridge, Charles Surface, Claude Melnotte, and Richelieu. Sullivan became established as a public favourite.

Sullivan was sole lessee and manager of the Theatre Royal, Melbourne from March 1863 to 16 February 1866, when he played his last night and relinquished management. His last year's lease he sublet to William Hoskins.

Sullivan completed a trip around the world in 1866, arriving in London early in September. From 1868 to 1870 he managed the Holborn theatre, where Beverley in The Gamester was one of his most powerful impersonations.

In the next 20 years Sullivan was constantly playing in London, the provinces and in the United States, he was most popular in Dublin, Cork, Liverpool and Manchester. When the memorial theatre at Stratford-on-Avon was opened, Sullivan was selected to play Benedick; Helena Faucit, emerging from retirement, played Beatrice. On the following evening Sullivan appeared as Hamlet. On 4 June 1887, while in Liverpool, he made his last appearance on the stage, playing Richard III.

Sullivan's health had been uncertain for some time and in the following year he suffered a stroke of paralysis. He was so ill in August 1888 that the last rites of his church were administered, but did not die until 3 May 1891. His wife and two sons and three daughters survived him.

Sullivan was five feet nine inches (175 cm) tall and had a wiry, slight figure which allowed him to play younger parts when he was middle-aged. For a long period Sullivan was one of the finest actors of his period, though at times inclined to err on the robust side. In Melbourne Sullivan's death resulted in lengthy obituaries; he was remembered as an actor and manager of 'more than ordinary talent, combined with considerable force of character, great tenacity of purpose, untiring industry, and a dogged application to the business of his profession'.

== Sources ==
- Knight, John Joseph (1898). "Sullivan, Barry" . In Lee, Sidney (ed.). Dictionary of National Biography. Vol. 55. London: Smith, Elder & Co.
- O'Connor, Barry (2004). "Sullivan, (Thomas) Barry (1821–1891)". Oxford Dictionary of National Biography (online ed.). Oxford University Press. doi:10.1093/ref:odnb/26773. (Subscription, Wikipedia Library access or UK public library membership required.)
