= George Coppin =

Australian impresario and politician (1819–1906)

George Selth Coppin
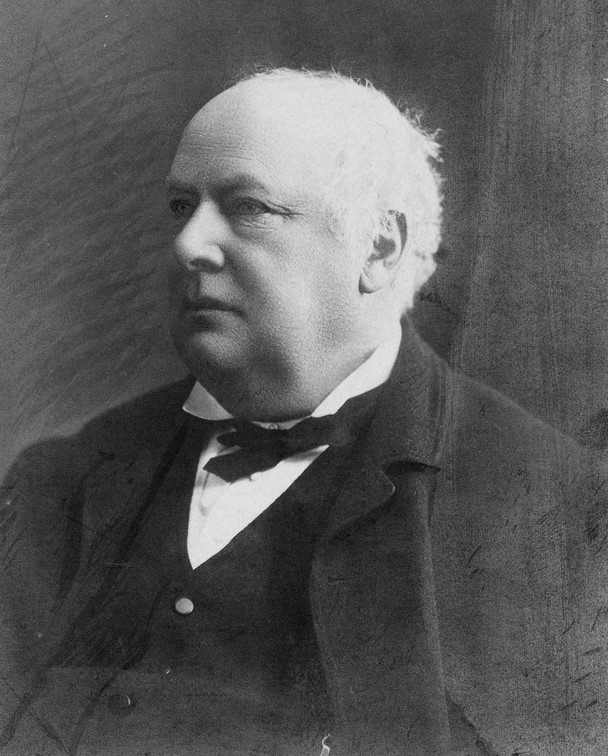
- George Coppin, ca. 1890
- Born: 8 April 1819; Steyning, Sussex, England
- Died: 14 March 1906 (aged 86); Richmond, Victoria, Australia
- Known for: comic actor, entrepreneur and politician

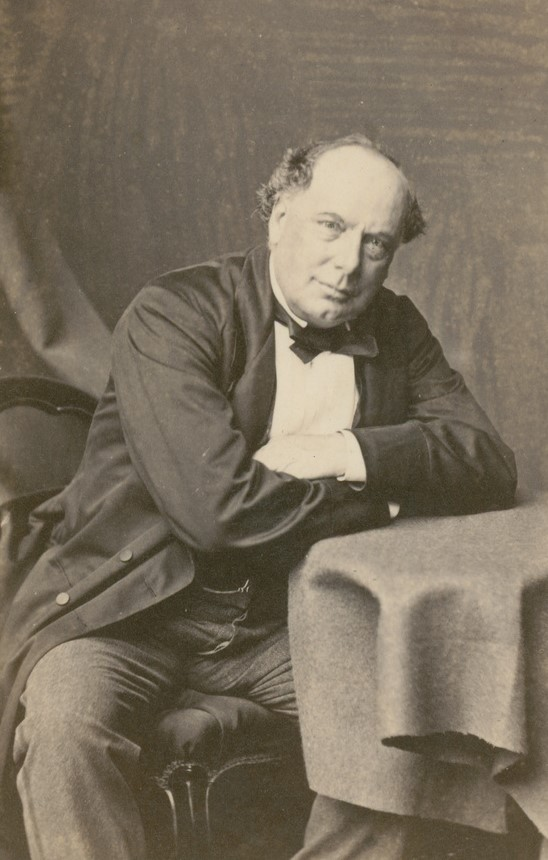

George Selth Coppin (8 April 1819 – 14 March 1906) was a comic actor, an impresario, a politician and a philanthropist, active in Australia.

== Early life ==
Coppin was born at Steyning, Sussex, England, son of George Selth Coppin (1794–1854), a Norwich surgeon, and Elizabeth Jane, née Jackson. His grandfather had been a well-known clergyman at Norwich. George Selth Coppin Senior studied for the medical profession, but abandoned this to join a group of travelling actors. George Coppin Junior (he rarely used his middle name, Selth) became an assistant in his father's company; George and his sister performed their own act by 1826.

At the age of 18 Coppin had an engagement at the Woolwich theatre, and soon afterwards was playing at Richmond, where he became low comedian at a salary of twenty-five shillings a week. He next obtained an engagement at the Queen's Theatre, London, and in subsequent years played as first low comedian in the provinces and at Abbey Theatre, Dublin, where he had a long acting engagement. There Coppin met Maria Watkins Burroughs, nine years older than Coppin. They lived together from 1842 to 1848.

== Australia ==
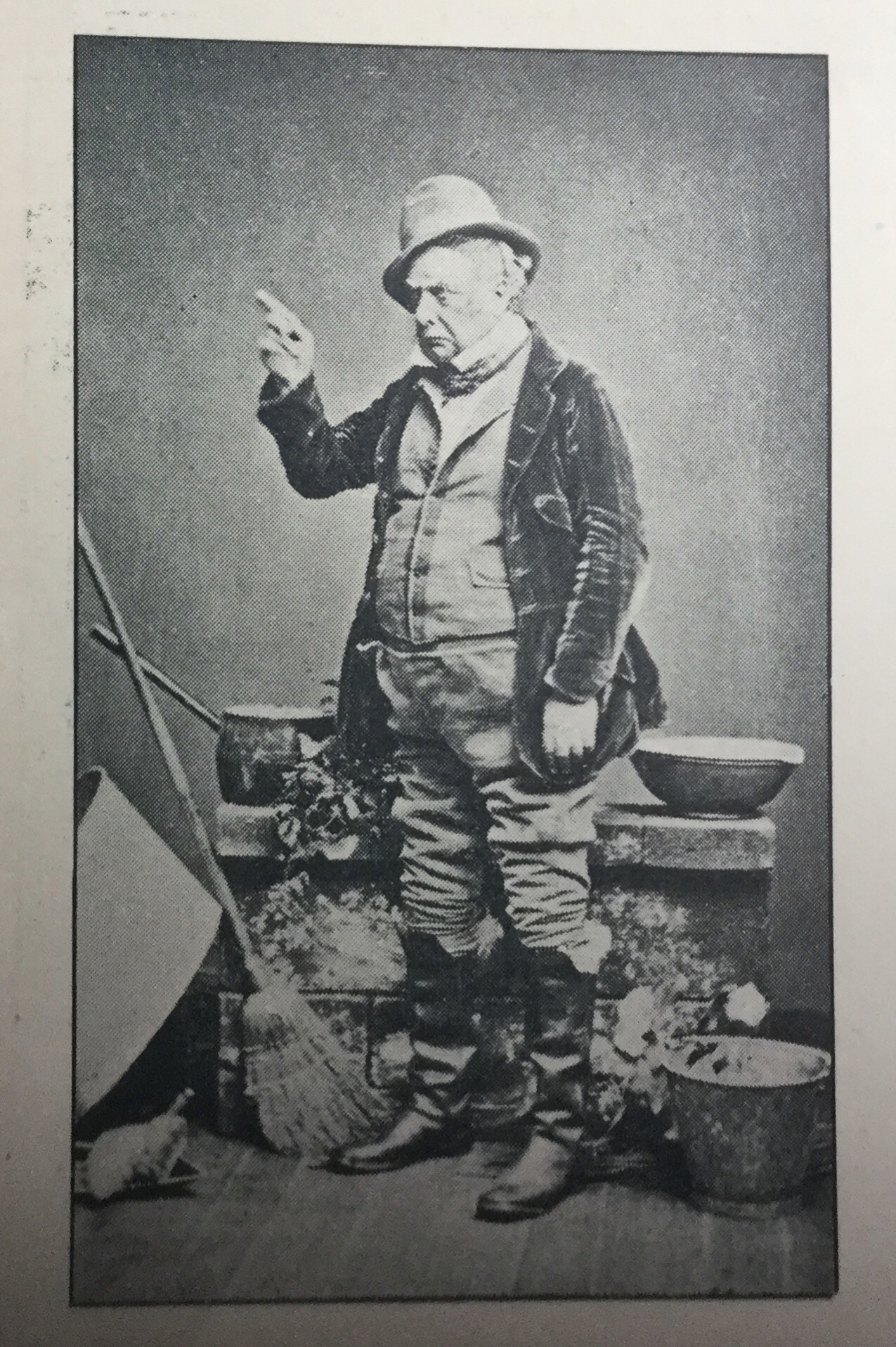
George Coppin as Milky White in Henry Thornton Craven's play

Coppin decided to leave England in search of other opportunities; a coin toss meant he sailed for Australia, not America, towards the end of 1842, arriving in Sydney on 10 March 1843. Coppin negotiated with Joseph Wyatt and had a successful season at the Royal Victoria Theatre. Coppin bought a hotel but, being quite inexperienced, lost his money and went to Hobart, Tasmania, in January 1845. At Launceston he formed a company, recruited George Herbert Rogers, and in June 1845 took it to Melbourne and opened at the Queen's Theatre, recently built by John Thomas Smith.

In August 1846, Coppin went to Adelaide, converted a billiard room into the New Queen's Theatre with a 700-seat capacity, and on 2 November 1846 began his season with The King and the Comedian, Coppin playing the part of Stolbach (the comedian). Coppin subsequently played a variety of parts including Sir Peter Teazle, Jacques Strop in Robert Macaire, Jemmy Twitcher in The Golden Farmer, Don Caesar in Don Caesar de Bazan and many others in forgotten plays. In 1848 Coppin transferred the management of the theatre to John Lazar.

Coppin and Lazar refurbished the old Queen's Theatre which, renamed "Royal Victoria Theatre", opened on 23 December 1850 and enjoyed great popularity, which lasted until the Theatre Royal opened in 1868. Around 1850 Coppin built Semaphore Hotel (and thereby gave that suburb its name) and the "White Horse Cellars", an hotel and theatre in Port Adelaide, later owned by William Knapman. Coppin suffered losses in his copper-mining investments and with the exodus of his hotel and playhouse patrons to the Victorian diggings, he became insolvent.

He left Adelaide for Victoria in December 1851, tried his fortunes briefly as a gold-digger without success, began playing at Geelong, then returned to Adelaide in 1853 to pay his creditors "20 shillings in the pound" (i.e. in full). Still in 1853, Coppin visited England where he acted in the provinces. There he met Gustavus Vaughan Brooke, engaged a company, and returned to Australia bringing with them an iron theatre in sections which was erected in Melbourne as the Princess Theatre. Brooke was to establish a great reputation in Australia. In July 1855 Coppin was playing Colonel Damas with him in The Lady of Lyons, and about this time they became partners. They purchased Melbourne's Theatre Royal and the Cremorne Gardens a pleasure garden on the banks of the Yarra River at Richmond in Melbourne, Australia, and spent £60,000 on them. In 1859 Coppin imported six camels from Aden as exhibits for the Cremorne Gardens menagerie and in 1860 he sold them for £300 to the Exploration Committee of the Royal Society of Victoria who used them on the Burke and Wills expedition.

The partnership of Brooks and Coppin was dissolved in 1859 and Coppin, having become security for a large sum in connection with the Melbourne and Suburban railway, was in financial difficulties again. The line was sold and he became freed from his liability. In 1862 he built the Haymarket Theatre on the south side of Bourke Street, and in 1863 Mr and Mrs Charles Kean played a season there.

Coppin initially made his reputation as an actor but, after he had been a few years in Australia, management took up increasing amounts of his time. He was a comedian, who starred in parts like Paul Pry, Bob Acres, and Lancelot Gobbo. He also played Aminadab Sleek in The Serious Family, Mawworm in The Hypocrite and Tony Lumpkin. James Smith, a critic of his time, spoke of his success in presenting "the ponderous stolidity and impenetrable stupidity of certain types of humanity—the voice, the gait, the movements, the expression of the actor's features, were all in perfect harmony with the mental and moral idiosyncrasies of the person he represented, so that the man himself stood before you a living reality".

In 1864 Coppin again lost his money and went to the United States. At a farewell dinner he was presented with a cheque for £300 and was given a public reception when he returned in 1866. He joined Harwood, Stewart, Hennings and Bellair in the management of the Theatre Royal chain, and, although they lost heavily at times, Coppin's record from this point is one of increasing prosperity. He was lessee of the Prince of Wales briefly 1867–68, followed by Willian Dind, who quit the business when that theatre was destroyed by fire.

In 1869 Coppin spearheaded The Old Colonists' Association of Victoria, which received a government grant of land in North Fitzroy for the establishment of safe, dignified, affordable housing for needy early settlers at a time when there was no social welfare system of any kind.

In 1869 Coppin purchased the property "Invergowrie" in Hawthorn in Melbourne's inner east, and soon subdivided the large landholdings, establishing two streets through the area, namely Coppin Grove and Shakespeare Grove. (The joke has been made that Coppin named the two streets after his two favourite actors.) Despite the land subdivision, "Invergowrie" survives at 21 Coppin Grove, (Note: Coppin Grove became notorious in 2020 as the scene of a stabbing spree in which two women were fatally attacked.) and is regarded as one Hawthorn's most important historical buildings. Coppin Street, Richmond was also named after George Coppin.

George Coppin was also a very senior leader within Freemasonry and a pioneer on many levels. He was an active Freemason from his stay in Adelaide until his death. He played a key role in the formation of the Grand Lodge of Victoria in 1883, of which he became the first Grand Master. The Coppin Masonic Lodge in East Brunswick bears his name as does Coppin Hall at the Royal Freemasons Homes.

== Political career ==
In April 1858 Coppin began to take an interest in public affairs—he became a councillor in the Richmond municipality, and in October 1858 was elected for the South Western Province in the Victorian Legislative Council for a term of five years. In 1859 he was forced by public pressure to defend the propriety of a legislator appearing on stage, arguing at the Theatre Royal, Ballarat, that the profession of actor was as respectable as any other. In 1859 he brought in a transfer of property bill which was passed in the Council and rejected in the Assembly. Three years later it became law, James Service taking charge of it in the assembly, and Coppin in the council. This measure (often referred to as the "Torrens Act" for R. R. Torrens, who promoted it) has proved to be a very valuable one. Coppin resigned from the Council in February 1863.

Coppin was elected to the Victorian Legislative Assembly for East Melbourne in May 1874 and did useful work; for example, he established post office savings banks. Coppin was opposed to the payment of members of Parliament, and when the act passed to pay them, he gave his salary to charities. Coppin retired from theatrical management on 28 June 1882, but remained a member of the Legislative Assembly until losing his seat in March 1889. Soon after, in August 1889, he was elected as member for Melbourne Province in the Victorian Legislative Council, holding this seat until August 1895.

== Later life ==
Coppin took an interest in the development of Sorrento, Victoria where he had a seaside home, and kept up his connection with the Old Colonists' Association (which he had founded), the Victorian Humane Society, Gordon House, the St John's Ambulance Service, the Australasian Dramatic and Musical Association, and other institutions. When managing the Cremorne Gardens he had brought out the first balloon to ascend in Melbourne, and was responsible for the acclimatization of English thrushes and white swans. He was also the first to suggest the value of camels for the Australian interior. He died early in the morning of 14 March 1906, aged 86. He was married twice, firstly in August 1855 to Harriet Hilsden née Bray (Gustavus Brooke's sister-in-law, died 2 September 1859), and then on 4 June 1861 to her daughter Lucy Hilsden, who survived him with their two sons and five daughters. Two of the three daughters of his first marriage also survived Coppin. His daughter Blanche Brooke Coppin married George Rossi Ashton (born 1857), a well-known black-and-white artist and brother of Julian Ashton, in Melbourne on 23 October 1883.

A bronze plaque to Coppin's memory was unveiled at the Comedy Theatre, Melbourne, on 26 March 1939. He is there described as "Philanthropist and Father of the Theatre in Victoria".

Alec Bagot's biography, Coppin the Great: Father of the Australian Theatre, was published by Melbourne University Press in 1965. Theatre Heritage Australia published a further biography in 2025.

== See also ==
- The Anchorage, Sorrento, built 1870
- Continental Hotel, Sorrento, built 1875
- Mechanics Institute, Sorrento, built 1876
