= Theatre Royal, Melbourne =

Theatre in Melbourne, Australia

Coordinates: 37.8130°S 144.9665°E

The Theatre Royal was one of the premier theatres for nearly 80 years in the city of Melbourne, Victoria, Australia, from 1855 to 1932. It was located at what is now 236 Bourke Street, once the heart of the city's theatre and entertainment district.

== History ==
The first Theatre Royal in Melbourne was a ‘ramshackle affair’ attached to the Eagle Tavern on Bourke Street between Swanston and Elizabeth Streets. It was a utilitarian weatherboard barn-like structure measuring 65 ft. by 35 ft. and cost £1000. Originally known as The Pavilion, and later as the Theatre Royal, it closed in 1845 due to competition from the superior facilities of the newly opened Queen’s Theatre in Queen Street. An early William Liardet watercolour of the tavern and theatre depicts the rough and ready nature of the pioneer settlement.

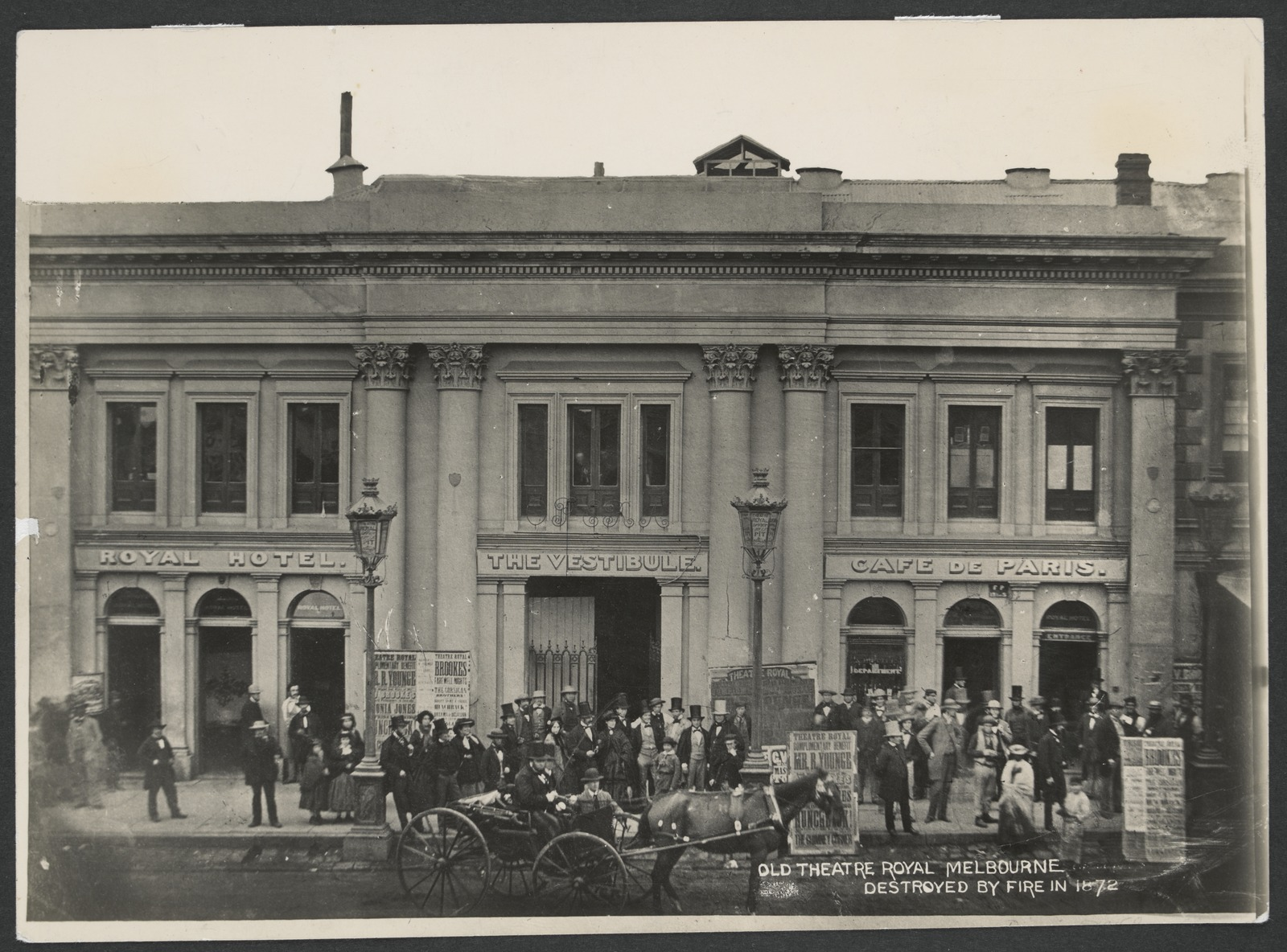
Theatre Royal Melbourne, 1861. State Library Victoria H20742

Ten years later, in 1855, Melbourne's second Theatre Royal was built a block away, on the north side of Bourke Street between Swanston and Russell Streets, by John Melton Black. It was capable of holding 3300 people and was comparable in size to London's Drury Lane and Covent Garden theatres. The opening production on 16 July 1855 was Richard Sheridan's The School for Scandal. Described as a "magnificent theatre", the £60,000 cost of the theatre's construction ultimately bankrupted Black.

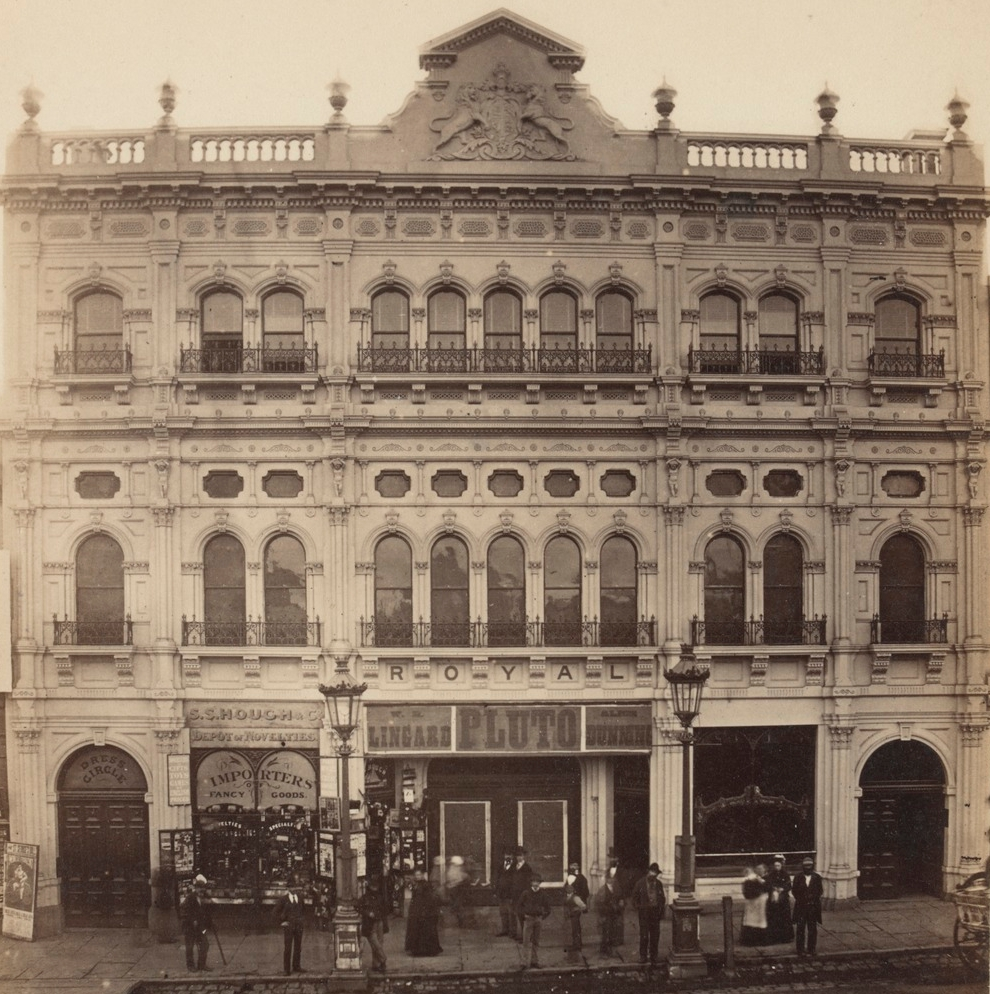
The Theatre Royal, Melbourne, 1877.

Barry Sullivan was sole lessee and manager from March 1863 to 16 February 1866, when he played his last night and relinquished management. His lease still had a year to run, and he sublet it to William Hoskins, but it was taken over by a partnership of Richard Stewart (father of Nellie Stewart), (Note: Nellie Stewart, who was born in Sydney, made her first appearance as a child at the Theatre Royal during this period.) H. R. Harwood, T. S. Bellair, Charles Vincent, John Hennings, and J. C. Lambert, then in 1867 George Coppin joined, and Bellair, Lambert and Vincent dropped out. Coppin bought his partners out, and was sole manager in April 1872 when the theatre burned down. Coppin immediately rebuilt it bigger and better (the new theatre could seat 4,000 people over four tiers), and opened in November the same year, under joint management by Coppin, Stewart, Harwood and Hennings.

It was remodelled in 1904, seating fewer people more comfortably on three tiers, but the growing popularity of the moving pictures in the 1920s affected theatre attendance, as did the effects of the Great Depression in the early 1930s. In late 1933, the theatre organisation J C Wiliamson announced plans to rebuild Her Majesty's, and that the Royal site was considered too congested and valuable, and had been sold to Manton's, who planned a new department store for the site. A final performance took place on 17 November 1933, and then demolishers moved in the next day. Manton's later became a Coles store, itself redeveloped into a Target store in the 1970s, rebranded in 2022 as Kmart.
