= Royal Victoria Theatre, Sydney =

Australian theatre

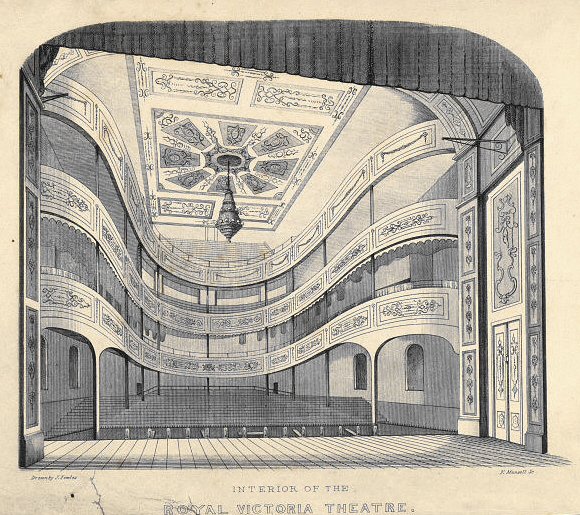
Interior of the Royal Victoria Theatre

The Royal Victoria Theatre, often referred to as the Victoria Theatre or The Old Vic, was a theatre in Sydney, Australia, the first large theatre in the city. It opened in 1838; operas, plays, pantomimes and other events were held, and leading entertainers performed at the theatre. It was destroyed by fire in 1880.

== Background and opening ==
The theatre was built by Joseph Wyatt; formerly a haberdasher, he had been a lessee of the first theatre in Sydney, the Theatre Royal, since 1835, and was sole lessee after 1836. In that year he planned another, larger, theatre. It was designed by Henry Robertson (c. 1802 – 9 September 1881) and the foundation stone was laid on 7 September 1836.

The new theatre, in Pitt Street, between Park and Market streets, opened on 26 March 1838, with a performance of Shakespeare's Othello. The theatre had a three-storey façade of Georgian style, and the front section included a hotel. The interior was of Regency style. There were 1,900 seats. 1,000 were in a large pit extending below the dress circle – the first theatre in Australia to have this arrangement – with upper circle and gallery above. Entry to the dress and upper circle was through the main entrance, and other patrons used a side entrance. The Sydney Monitor reported that the building was "truly elegant. ... From the pit you would suppose that you were in a large provincial theatre in England." In 1841 the theatre was fitted with gas lighting.

== Following years ==
Actors associated with the Theatre Royal moved to the Victoria Theatre, including John Lazar, who was manager of the theatre until the early 1840s. The population of Sydney was small in relation to the size of the theatre, so that a proper repertoire could not be built up: there were frequent changes of programme, leading to poorly rehearsed performances.

In March 1841 Wyatt sailed for England to recruit actors, returning in January 1843. While he was away the theatre was managed by William Knight, a hotel owner. The new actors engaged faced opposition from the Sydney actors, and the Sydney Morning Herald commented on 25 January 1843: "Of the twelve brought out by him from England there is not one equal in ability to the leading members, male or female, of the old company". Wyatt eventually sacked some of his actors.

Operas, dramas, burlesques, pantomimes and other amusements were held. George Coppin made his Australian debut in the theatre in 1843. Other performers seen during the theatre's history included Lola Montez, Gustavus Vaughan Brooke, Anna Bishop, George Darrell and William Creswick. The first opera written, composed and produced in Australia, Don John of Austria, premiered there in May 1847. John Gibbs, of Woolloomooloo Bay, was leader of the orchestra 1842–1869, also Toogood's Grand Concert Hall 1858–1861. Gibbs, later a teacher of violin, piano and singing, died June 1875. He was the possessor of an instrument by Andrew Guarnerius.

In 1854 the theatre was purchased by a consortium including Joshua Josephson, and leased by a succession of managers, including Wilson and Habbe 1870–71, when Mary Gladestane had a season, first as Frou-Frou, then in October as Queen Elizabeth, when Alfred, Duke of Edinburgh attended.

On 22 July 1880, the uninsured theatre burned to the ground, also Hardie and Mitchell's steam mill behind the theatre. Three men were killed — buried under the rubble when a wall collapsed. The site, at 199 Pitt Street, was taken over for Harris & Ackman's new auction rooms. In May 1915 the Strand picture theatre opened on the same site. By 1933 the site had been taken by McCathie's, Ltd.
