= Gustavus Vaughan Brooke =

Irish stage actor

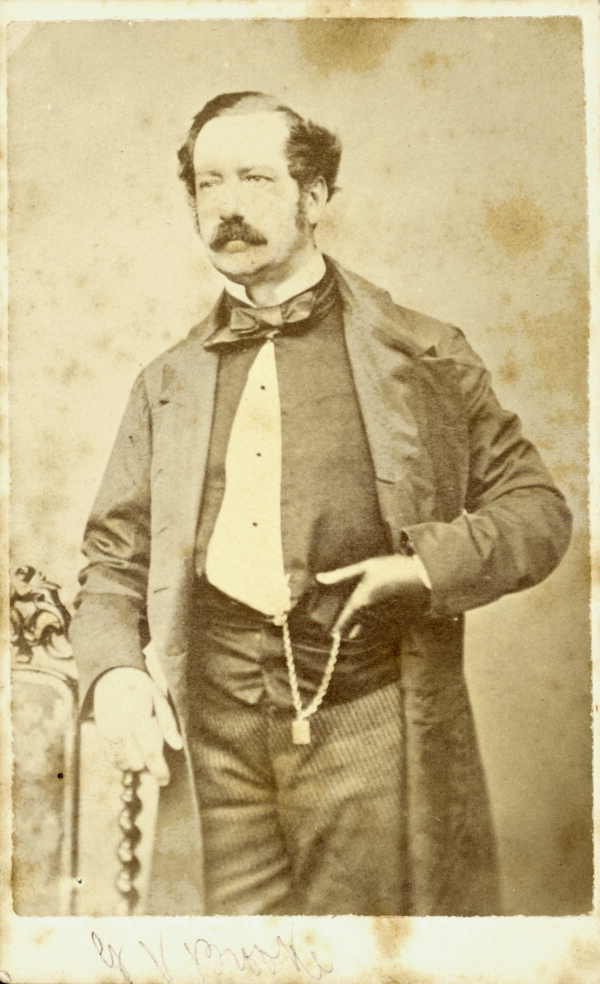
Gustavus Vaughan Brooke

Gustavus Vaughan Brooke (25 April 1818 – 11 January 1866), commonly referred to as G. V. Brooke, was an Irish stage actor who enjoyed success in Ireland, England, and Australia.

== Early life ==
Brooke was born in Dublin, Ireland, on April 25, 1818.

== Acting career develops ==
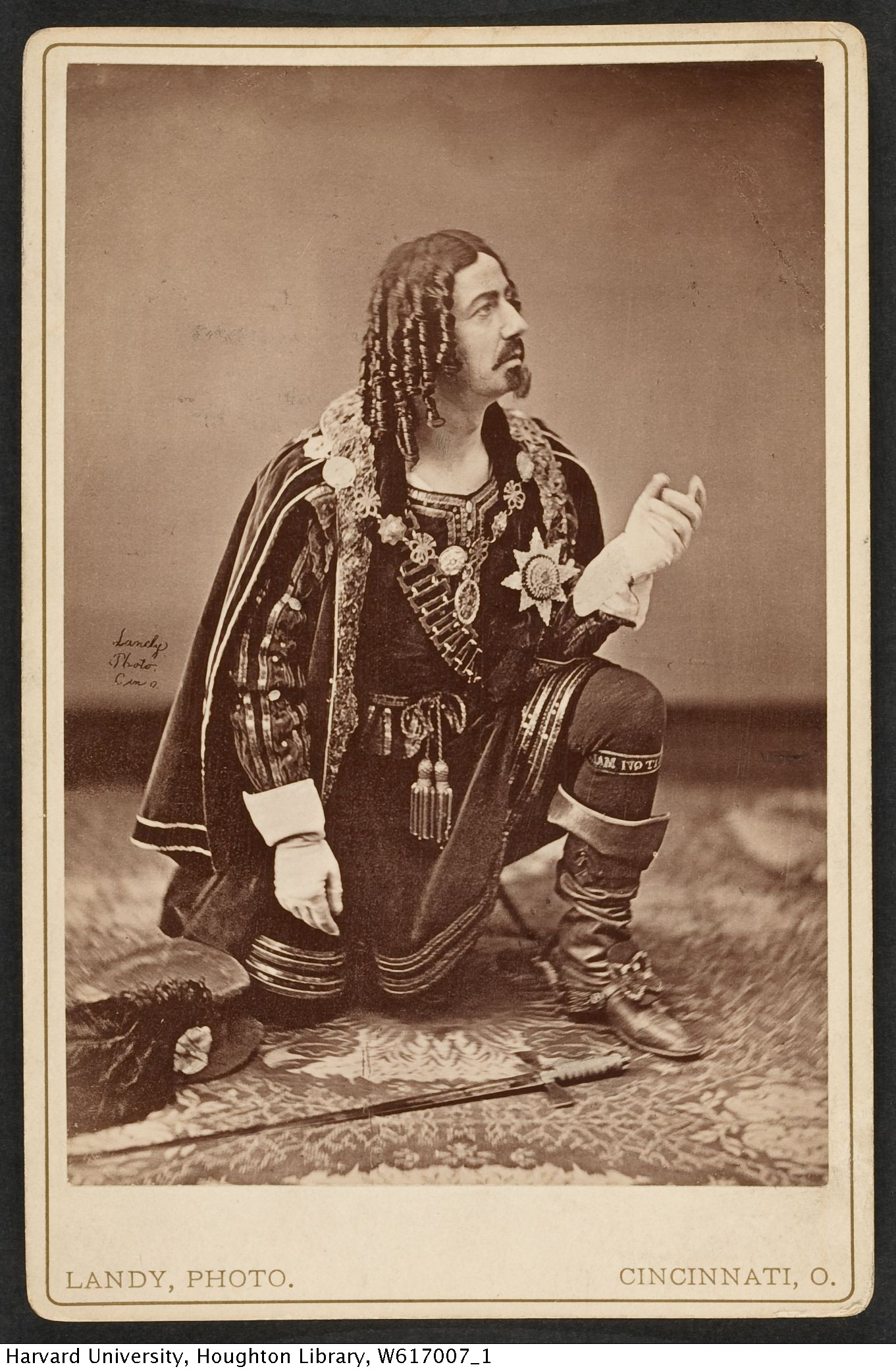
Brooke in costume (undated)

He agreed to go to Australia to give two hundred performances in the major towns there and in New Zealand. He left England on 25 November 1854, played a week at Cape Town Garrison Theatre and arrived at Melbourne on 23 February 1855. The Australian tour opened three days later at the Queen's Theatre, Melbourne. Brooke's last Melbourne appearance was on 28 May 1861. On the 30 May he boarded the SS Great Britain, travelling with his future wife, American Avonia Jones, and her mother. They arrived in Liverpool 5 August 1861.

== Financial difficulties ==
In Ireland in May, 1863 at the Theatre Royal, Dublin he played Julian St. Pierre in The Wife; in the cast was a young actor Sydney Bancroft, later better known as Squire Bancroft.

He died in a shipwreck in 1866; he was 47 years old. Actor Fred Younge read a moving tribute to his longtime associate on 17 March 1866 at the Victoria Theatre, Sydney, the scene of many of his triumphs. His widow, who had remained in England rather than risk encountering Brooke's first wife Marianne, died from consumption the following year.

== Posthumous recognition ==
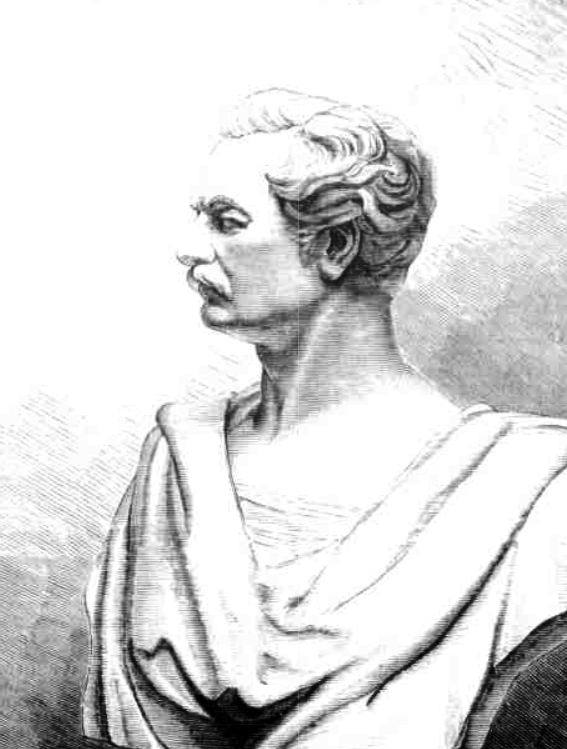
Bust of Brooke by Charles Summers

Shortly after the news of Brooke's death arrived in Melbourne, members of the Melbourne Press Club decided on a series of stage performances to raise money for a permanent memorial in the form of a statue. They chose Boucicault's London Assurance, which they played several times to good houses in Melbourne and country centres. They supplemented the profits with donations from the public, but when the bust arrived from Charles Summers' studio in England, there was still insufficient funds to cover its cost, and Gilbert Roberts offered to make up the difference if it were first unveiled at his Duke of Edinburgh Theatre. The custodians of the statue agreed and the ceremony went off smoothly, however some important people took offence at not having been consulted and held a more dignified unveiling at the art gallery attached to the Public Library, installing it between busts of Edmund and Charles Kean.

In London, a committee of actors was formed to raise money to commemorate Brooke, and it was resolved to acquire a lifeboat for the Poolbeg station, near Dublin, his birthplace. The G V Brooke (sometimes given as Gustavus V Brooke) was built by Forrestt of Limehouse, exhibited in London, and then relaunched at the Dublin shipyard of Walpole, Webb & Bewley on 20 September 1866, in the presence of Brooke's widow.

== Legacy ==
In the 1960s, the Canadian novelist Robertson Davies and the Australian composer Peter Sculthorpe discussed collaborating on an opera based on Brooke's Australian adventures.
