= Inez =

- Pronunciation: /iːˈnɛz/, /aɪˈnɛθ/
- Gender: Female
- Language: Spanish, Portuguese, French

Origin
- Meaning: "holy", "pure", "virginal"

Other names
- Related names: Agnes

Inez is a feminine given name. It is the English (and other third language) spelling of the Spanish, Portuguese and French name Inés/Inês/Inès, itself a form of the given name "Agnes". The name is pronounced as /iːˈnɛz/, /aɪˈnɛz/, or /aɪˈnɛθ/.

Agnes is a woman's given name, which derives from the Greek word hagnē, meaning "pure" or "holy". The Latinized form of the Greek name is Hagnes, the feminine form of Hagnos, meaning "chaste" or "sacred".

== People ==
- Inéz (born 1990), German singer
- Inez (Tina Inez Gavilanes Granda, born 1977), Danish singer
- Inez Knight Allen (1876–1937), American Mormon missionary and politician
- Inez Andrews (1929–2012), American singer
- Inez Asher (1911–2006), American novelist and television writer
- Inez Barron (born 1946), American politician
- Inez Baskin (1916–2007), American journalist
- Inez Bensusan (1871–1967), Australian-born actress, playwright and suffragette in the UK
- Inez Clough (1873–1933), American actress
- Inez Courtney (1908–1975), American actress
- Inez Bjørg David (born 1982), Danish actress and TV presenter working in Germany
- Inez Dickens (born 1949), American politician
- Inez Fabbri (1931–1909), Austrian American singer
- Inez Fischer-Credo (1928–2016), Canadian equestrian
- Inez De Florio-Hansen (born 1943), German linguist
- Inez Foxx (1937–2022), American singer
- Inez Fung (born 1949), American climatologist
- Inez García (1941–2003), American feminist
- Inez Barbour Hadley (1879–1971), American soprano singer
- Inez M. Haring, (1875-1968), American botanist
- Inez Hogan (1895–1973), American writer and illustrator
- Inez Haynes Irwin (1873–1970), American author and politician
- Inez James (1919–1993), American composer
- Inez Y. Kaiser (1918–2016), American entrepreneur
- Inez van Lamsweerde (born 1963), Dutch photographer
- Inez Magnusson (1897–1953), also known as Inez Johansson, Swedish fraudster
- Inez McCormack (1943–2013), Northern Irish trade union leader and human rights activist
- Inez Milholland (1886–1916), American suffragist
- Inez Palange (1889–1962), American actress
- Inez Pearn (1913-1976), English novelist
- Inez Pijnenburg (born 1949), Dutch politician
- Inez Plummer (born 1884-1887, died 1964), American actress
- Inez Beverly Prosser (1895–1934), American psychologist
- Ines Reingold-Tali, Estonian musician and artist, also known as Inèz
- Inez Storer (born 1933), American painter
- Inez Tenenbaum (born 1951), American attorney
- Inez Trueman (1917–2015), Canadian politician
- Inez Turner (born 1972), Jamaican sprinter
- Inez Clare Verdoorn (1896–1989), South African botanist and taxonomist
- Inez Viegas (born 1970), Brazilian actress
- Inez Voyce (1924–2022), American baseball player
- Emily Inez Denny (1853–1918), American painter
- Mildred Inez Caroon Bailey (1919–2009), American military commander
- V. Inez Archibald (born 1945), British Virgin Islander politician and businesswoman

Surname

- Colette Inez (1931–2018), American poet
- Maycon Carvalho Inez (born 1986), Brazilian footballer
- Mike Inez (born 1962), American bass guitarist
- Romain Inez (born 1988), French footballer

== Characters ==
- Inez, the character played by Lumi Cavazos in Bottle Rocket
- Inez, the character played by Sofía Vergara in Chef
- Inez, a character from the PBS children's animated TV series Cyberchase
- Inez, the character played by Rachel McAdams in Midnight in Paris
- Inez Salinger, a character from the American soap opera One Life to Live
- Inez Scull, a character in the Larry McMurtry novel Comanche Moon
- Inès Serrano, a character in Jean-Paul Sartre's No Exit
- Little Inez Stubbs, the character from Hairspray (2007) played by Taylor Parks
- Inez Temple, the superhero known as Outlaw in Marvel Comics
- Inez Victor, née Christian, character in Joan Didion's Democracy
- Inez Wong, the mother of Amy Wong on the TV series Futurama
- Inez, a doll from the Groovy Girls doll line by Manhattan Toy

== Other ==
- Hurricane Inez, A destructive Category 5 Atlantic Hurricane that impacted the Caribbean, Bahamas, Florida, and Mexico, killing over 1,000 people in 1966.
