= Inez (disambiguation) =

Inez is a feminine given name.

Inez may also refer to:

== People ==
- Inéz (singer), German singer
- Inez (singer), Danish singer
- Inéz, Estonian artist

== Places ==
- Inez, Kentucky, United States
- Inez, Nebraska
- Inez, Texas, United States
- Inez, West Virginia

== Other uses ==
- Hurricane Inez
- Inez (novel), by Carlos Fuentes
