= John Thomson Hall =

Australian violinist (1841–1883)

John Thomson Hall (7 February 1841 – 2 December 1883), was an Australian violinist.

== History ==
Hall was born in Sydney, the eldest son of John Hall, and began violin lessons at age seven. He loved music, and was playing in public before the age of twelve. He then studied under the respected violinist Caranzani del Valle, and at age 24 he was appointed orchestra leader with Lyster's Opera Company. Five years later was appointed musical director, and produced some of the finest operas that had been heard in Australia. He was closely associated with the pianist Alfred Anderson, and during Ilma de Murska's 1875 Australian tour both accompanied the celebrated soprano, who married Anderson shortly before he died. In this connection, he has been confused with the conductor John Thomas Hill who, like Anderson, married De Murska shortly before he died.

He was appointed orchestra leader at the Theatre Royal, Adelaide in 1873, and maintained that position until shortly before his death.

== Compositions ==
- St Agatha (sacred march) 1876
- "Amy" (galop)

== Family ==
Hall was married to Amy Hall and had children. They faced destitution, and in July 1884 Mrs Hall sold their home at Rundle Street, Kent Town and household effects.

After Hall's death, his brother George Hall took the post of the Theatre Royal's orchestra leader. He returned to Sydney in 1886 and was performing at a high level in 1887 but nothing further has been found.
