= Petri Kuljuntausta =

Finnish composer, musician, sound artist and author

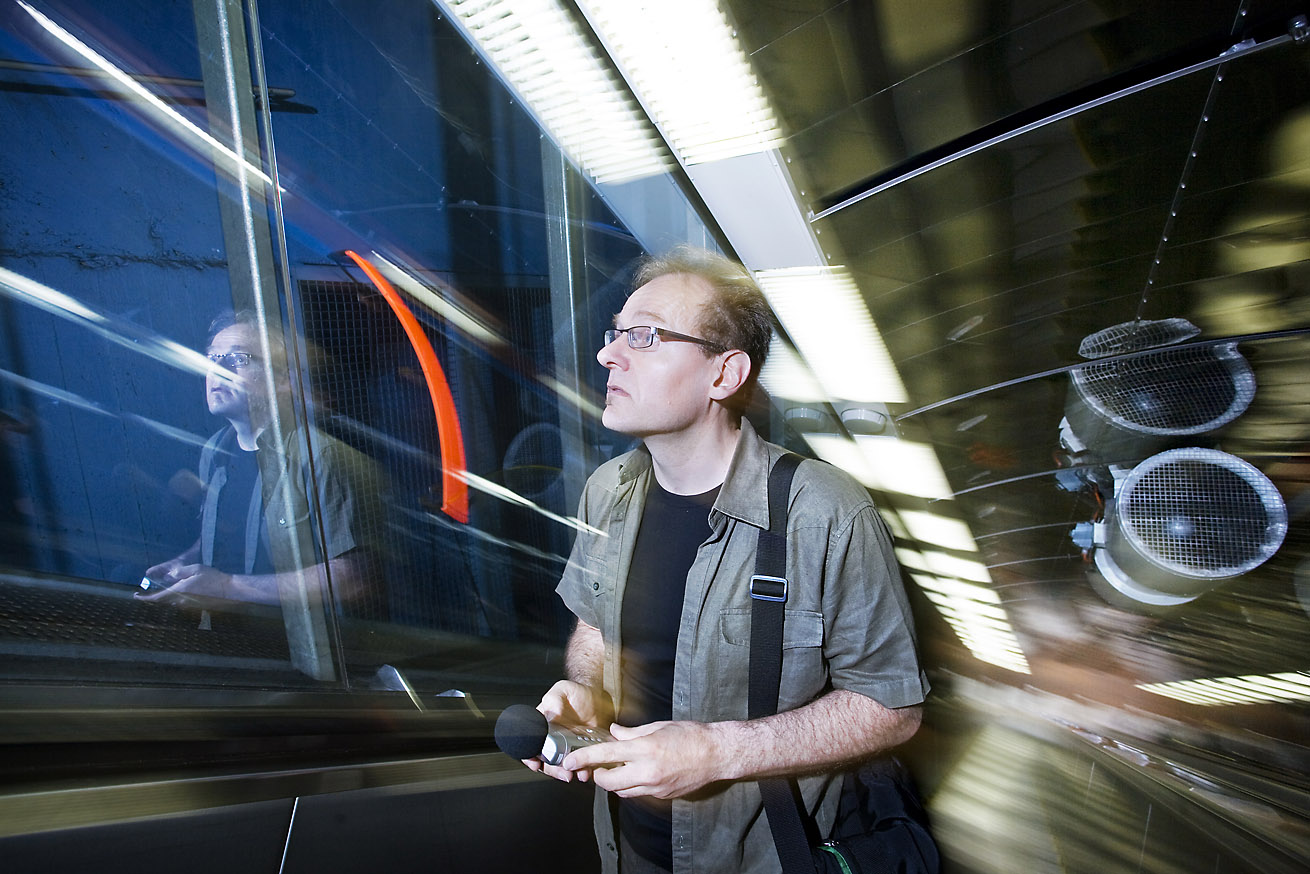
Petri Kuljuntausta recording sounds of a metro station

Petri Kuljuntausta is a Finnish composer, musician, sound artist and author of three books on electronic music and sound art. Since the 1990s he has belonged to a new generation of composers in Finland interested in experimental and electronic music.

== Career ==
Kuljuntausta has composed digital music for experimental films, video art, visual art and dance projects, and made media and sound installations in museums, galleries and concert halls. His works has been performed in many European countries, Australia, Mexico and the US, and he has made recordings for various labels in Australia, Colombia, England, Estonia, Finland, France, Germany, India, Sweden and the USA. In 2004 Star's End and Inner Space radio shows selected Kuljuntausta's Momentum as one of the most significant CD releases of the year. In 2005 he won an award, The Finnish State Prize for Art, from the Finnish government as a distinguished national artist. NPS, the Nederlandse Programma Stichting (Dutch broadcasting foundation), and Yleisradio (Finnish Broadcasting Company) has produced extensive artistic profiles on Kuljuntausta.

Kuljuntausta is famous for music composed of sounds both natural and extraordinary. In close collaboration with natural scientists, he has composed underwater installations from underwater materials and made music out of whale calls and the sounds of the Northern Lights. In many ways Kuljuntausta's art is based on good knowledge of tradition. Environmental sounds, live electronic music, improvisation and collaborations with Media Artists has influenced him as a composer.

One of his many challenging composition projects is Northern Lights Live, which is based on soundscapes of the Northern Lights and audio feedback. The work was commissioned by the ISEA2004 (Inter-Society for the Electronic Arts) festival, 12th Symposium on Electronic Arts. Northern Lights Live is a vivid collaboration in the field between art and science, recycling original nature recordings of the phenomena as well as processed aurora borealis sounds. A forty-five-minute-long continuous audio-visual dialogue between nature's own soundscapes and their digitally altered, urban noise-art substitutes were created on stage. In collaboration with zoomusicologist Dario Martinelli, Kuljuntausta released in 2008 a CD entitled Zoosphere. A Musical Encryptation of Animal Sounds, which is entirely based on animal sounds, like the sounds of birds, whales, wolves, shrimps. Kuljuntausta has also composed extensive body of works in the style of Minimalist music. Since mid-1990s he has developed new composition technique based on Phasing. Repetitive music could be heard especially in his film and video soundtracks.

In collaboration with visual artist and experimental film director Sami van Ingen Kuljuntausta has created media installations where the energy of light waves reveal audible sounds (Wave Motion), and the sound waves in water reveal moving light figures with the help of laser beams (Waves & Patterns). Soundscapes and environmental sounds are often present in his works. Another distinctive character in his music is the use of feedback noise. Kuljuntausta has developed his own electronic system to generate and control feedback sounds live.

The most extreme musical environment for Kuljuntausta's music is Saturn's moon Titan. When Cassini-Huygens spacecraft (Titan-IVB/Centaur) started its journey in 1997 from Kennedy Space Center, United States, his composition Charm of Sound was inside the Huygens probe of Cassini-Huygens spacecraft, stored on the CD-rom. When Huygens probe reached its destination on Friday January 14, 2005, Kuljuntausta's Charm of Sound landed on the ground of Titan after travelling seven years and four billion kilometres through Space.

Kuljuntausta has collaborated with composers and artists Morton Subotnick, Atau Tanaka, Richard Lerman, David Rothenberg, Robert Jürjendal, Markus Reuter, Pat Mastelotto, Chris Mann, Jim Nollman, Dario Martinelli, Al Margolis (If, Bwana), Helmut Lemke, Ocean-North, Juhani Liimatainen, Juhani Nuorvala, Hepa Halme, Jukka Orma, Markku Veijonsuo, Markus Fagerudd, Rihmasto, John Richardson, and VJ group Random Doctors, and he has produced and coordinated many album projects since late-1990s. In 2011 Kuljuntausta composed soundtrack for the film Five Fragments of the Extinct Empathy (directed by Anna Nykyri), the film was selected as the Best Short Documentary 2012 at the Hot Docs Canadian International Documentary Festival, Toronto. Two years earlier, in 2009, Kuljuntausta composed soundtrack for the film Water Cities (directed by Jaana Puhakka) which won the first prize at III. Istanbul International Architecture and Urban Films Festival in Istanbul, Turkey. He has also composed music for the films Texas Scramble, The Blow, Days, and Navigator, all directed by Sami van Ingen.

Kuljuntausta is the author of an 800-page history of Finnish electronic music, On/Off. Eetteriäänistä sähkömusiikkiin (On/Off. From Ether Sounds To Electronic Music) (Kiasma and Like Publishing). With the book was released a CD compilation (compiled, restored and produced by Kuljuntausta), which contains the first Finnish electronic compositions from the years 1958-1963 first time on the CD.

In 2006, Kuljuntausta published his second book, Äänen eXtreme (eXtreme Sound) (Like Publishing), on his own approach to music and sound. Together with the book was released a DVD, which was simply entitled as Petri Kuljuntausta (also known as 1994-2005, referring to the composition period of the disc), which contains almost nine hours of electronic music and sound works (42 works) composed and performed by Kuljuntausta. His third book, First Wave (Like Publishing), on Finnish electronic music was published in English in 2008.

Kuljuntausta is the founder of Charm of Sound association (Äänen Lumo), established in 1995 to support electronic music, experimental music and sound art, and the Finnish Society for Acoustic Ecology which was founded in 1999. Kuljuntausta was the founder and main editor of "..." ezine (electronic magazine, 1997–2001) and he also founded Charmlist emailing-list in 2001, both focused on distributing information on the activities on electronic music and sound art.

== Radio programme ==
During 1997-2005, Kuljuntausta produced a radio programme on electroacoustic music and sound art entitled Charmed Sounds (Lumottuja ääniä) for Yleisradio, Finnish Broadcasting Company. In 2000 Kuljuntausta worked at City University London, Department of Music / Composition (Electroacoustic), as a Visiting Scholar. During the visit he composed soundscape music from the sounds of London City. One of these works, Vroom!!, was released on Hearing Place (Sound Art Exploring Place from Around the World), a CD published by Australian label Move Records.

== Web sites ==
In 2005, Kuljuntausta produced internet (media) albums of Atau Tanaka, Richard Lerman, If, Bwana (Al Margolis) and Petri Kuljuntausta for Aureobel internet publishing company. Since its start the label has worked as a distribution channel for experimental music and sound art. In 2008, Kuljuntausta worked as an artistic director of the Nightingala festival and invited composers and performers to create music from nightingale song. In 2009, Science Centre Heureka commissioned Kuljuntausta to compose 20th anniversary music for the Science Centre. The original opening music of Heureka was composed by Einojuhani Rautavaara in 1989. In 2012 Aalto university commissioned a work from Kuljuntausta for the university's opening ceremony. Kuljuntausta lecturers regularly on Sonic Art, Electronic Music, and Soundscape Art at the University of Art and Design Helsinki and Theatre Academy (Finland).

== Concerts, performances (selected) ==
- International Film Festival Rotterdam, 2014
- Avant Festival (Sweden), 2013
- Helicotrema (Italy)
- Visiones Sonoras festival (Mexico)
- Insomnia Festival (Tromsø, Norway)
- ISEA 2004 festival
- Expo 2005 World Fair (Aiichi Japan)
- Ars Electronica festival ("Rivers & Bridges", Linz)
- Festival di Musica Acousmatica (Cagliari, Italy)
- Jauna Muzika festival (Vilnius, Lithuania)
- Futura festival (France)
- Synthese festival (Bourges, France)
- Electric Rainbow Coalition Festival (USA)
- Eclectica festival (Tartu)
- 8th Annual Santa Fe International Festival (USA)
- Música electroacústica de Hoy (Argentina)
- Festival Internacional de Musica de Cadiz (Cadiz Spain)
- Musica Nova (Helsinki, Finland)
- Avanto festival (Finland)
- Tampere Biennale (Finland)
- Finnish National Gallery (Helsinki)
- Kiasma Museum (Helsinki)
- Helsinki Sound 2001 (Finland)
- View (Finland)

== Sound galleries, exhibitions (selected) ==
- Chapman Gallery / University of Salford (Salford, UK)
- Hearing Place (Melbourne)
- Fondazione Nicola Trussardi (Milan, Italy)
- Three Rivers Arts Festival / SoundscapePGH (USA)
- Collage Jukebox (touring sound exhibition)
- Festival le Bruit de la Neige (Annecy France)
- Video Positive (Liverpool)
- Helsinki Kunsthalle (Helsinki)
- Helsinki City Art Museum
- Art Fair Suomi 09 (Cable Factory Finland)
- Korjaamo gallery (Helsinki)
- MuuTen (MUU festival)
- Pipe Hall gallery (Finland)
- Lusto Museum
- Tampere Hall (Winter Garden)
- Forum Box gallery (Helsinki)
- Galleri Leena Kuumola (Helsinki)

== Radio broadcasts, profiles, projects (selected) ==
- Folio (The Netherlands)
- Electric Storm (Canada)
- Quiet Space / ABC (Australia)
- Fieldwork 2SER 107FM (Australia)
- Crossover: Sound HR2 (Germany)
- Foldover WOBC 91.5FM (USA)
- Resonance 104.4 FM (London)
- Star's End (USA)
- Inner Space (Zagreb)
- Borderline Freien Radio Kassel (Germany)
- Difficult Listening (Australia)
- NPS-4FM/Muzikale Delicatessen (The Netherlands)
- Acoustic Frontiers (Canada)
- Springel & Zabrinsky (Brazil)
- Feedback Monitor (Canada)
- Kalvos & Damian (USA)
- Ström / SR (Sweden)
- Estonian Radio (Estonia)
- Yleisradio (Finland)

== Net projects, netcasts (selected) ==
- Sound Box 1.0 (Kiasma Museum)
- Sound Box 2.0 (Kiasma Museum)
- Sound Calendar (Austria & Canada)
- Le Train Fantôme (France)
- ARS01 / Arsradio (Kiasma Museum)
- Ääniradio 1 & 2 (Sibelius Academy, Finland)
- Audio Autographs (Finland)
- art@radio (USA)
- Elektra (France)
- Radio Internationale Stadt (Germany)

== Selected works ==
- QRZ1 (Variations On The Sounds Of DIMI-A) (2014)
- 3-to-4 (2014)
- Blast-off (2013)
- Traces of Sound (2012, 55:00)
- The Great White Bird (2012)
- Lecture on Site-Specific Art (2012)
- Emergence (2011)
- 1918 (2011)
- Hailstorm (2010)
- Marquis (2010)
- Clickz (2010)
- Mexican Cars (2009, 4:20)
- Irresistible District (2009, 28:00)
- Grooves (2009, 30:00)
- Water Cities (2009, film music)
- Heureka! (2009, 20th anniversary music, commissioned by Science Centre Heureka)
- Whistles, Trills & Clicks (2008, 13:00)
- Heavy Feather (2008, 4:30)
- Eight Rooms (2008)
- City Noise (2007, 30:00)
- Waves & Patterns (2006)
- Water City (2005, 55:10, altered versions)
- Noise City (2005, 41:26, altered versions)
- Wave Motion (2005)
- Nordic Prince (2005, 7:27)
- Zoomusicological 2 (2005, 16:06)
- 4'33" (2005, 4:33)
- Collaro 3RC-531 (2005, 5:45)
- Do Not Feed The Artists (2005, 34:24)
- Muu (Radio) (2005)
- Northern Lights Live (2004, 40:00)
- Navigator (2004, 5:31)
- Cosmic Jam (2004, 18:01)
- 15'00" (2003)
- Roaring Silence (2003, 5:18)
- Zoomusicological 1 (2003, 10:05)
- SoundHappens™ (2003)
- Planetarium (2003, 9:23)
- Code-X (2003, 10:24)
- A Zoomusicological Essay (2003, 28:40)
- Aurora Borealis 1 (2002)
- Deep Blue (2002, 12:08)
- Drifting (Walking Music) (200224:46)
- Landing (2002, 5:18)
- Formations (2002, 10:00)
- The Mixer (2002)
- Music For Three Bazookas And 12 Steel Sheets (2002, 12:24)
- Soundscape Miniatures (2002, 6:07)
- Four Notes (2001, 7:33)
- In The Beginning (2001, 12:45)
- Voice Miniatures 2 (2001, 8:11)
- Departs/Arrivals (2001, 13:50)
- St. Virus City (2000, 7:46)
- Vroom!! (2000, 8:11)
- Days (2000, 16:00)
- Sonic Miniatures 1 (2000, 5:55)
- Canvas (1999, 10:18)
- Voice Miniatures 1 (1999, 7:23)
- Hysteria (Fatigue) (1999, 5:53)
- Hysteria (Saint Vitus Contemporary Dance) (1999, 6:47)
- The Words (Soundtrack Variations) (1998, 16:48)
- Free Zone (1998)
- Transitions (1998, 5:18)
- Video Surveillance (1998, 20:01)
- Spartacus (1998, 60:00, music for dance theatre)
- Freedom (1998, 8:58)
- Momentum (1998, 6:10)
- Charm Of Sound (1997)
- The Blow (1997, 21:00)
- Anchorage (1997, 7:32)
- April Fool (1997, 28:38)
- Helsinki Soundscapes 1997 (1997)
- Ex Post Facto (1997, 10:40)
- Still Life (1997, 5:50)
- Theremin Dream (1997, 4:40)
- Birdscape Music (1997, 8:45)
- Violin Tone Orchestra (1996, 4:33)
- La Mer (1996, 20:03)
- The Flow (1996, 5:20)
- Texas Scramble (1995, 21:00)
- Lux In Tenebris (1995, 12:56)
- Between Life And Death (1995, 8:48)
- In A Shadow Zone (1995, 13:18)
- The Good And The Evil (1995, 10:45)
- Soundscapes 1 (1994, 5:59)

== Film and video works ==
- Primaries (2014), directed by Sami van Ingen, 45'
- Trails (2012), directed by Anna Nykyri, 7'
- Five Fragments of the Extinct Empathy (2011), directed by Anna Nykyri, 7'
- Clickz (2011), directed by Zlatko Ćosić, 1'
- Stagecoach (2010), directed by Sami van Ingen, 9'
- Water Cities (2009), directed by Jaana Puhakka 20'
- Grooves (2009), directed by Sami van Ingen, 30'
- Whistles, Trills & Clicks (2008), directed by Sami van Ingen, 13'
- Tomato One / Navigator (2006), directed by Sami van Ingen, 6'
- Junction (2006), directed by Jacques Coelho, 8'
- Northern Lights Live (2004), directed by Sami van Ingen, 45'
- The Days (2000), directed by Sami van Ingen, 16'
- Video Surveillance (1998, for real-time TV network), directed by Petri Kuljuntausta
- The Blow (1997), directed by Sami van Ingen, 21'
- Texas Scramble (1996), directed by Sami van Ingen, 21'
- LMCX (1994), directed by Jacques Coelho, 4'
- Bad Habit (1993), directed by Jacques Coelho, 5'
- La Planete Étrange (1992), directed by Jacques Coelho, 6'
- La Planete Sauvage (1992), directed by Jacques Coelho, 7'

== Discography ==
=== Releases ===
- Petri Kuljuntausta Project: Visions and Play (PKP, CD) 1992
- Petri Kuljuntausta: Private (CDr, Album), 1997
- Petri Kuljuntausta: Momentum (Aureobel CD), 2004
- Petri Kuljuntausta: Noise City (Aureobel, MP3 album with Multimedia), 2005
- Petri Kuljuntausta w/ Markus Reuter-Pat Mastelotto: Live In Helsinki (ProjeKction, MP3 album), 2006
- Petri Kuljuntausta: 1994-2005 (DVD), 2006
- Petri Kuljuntausta w/ Robert Jürjendal-David Rothenberg: 3Corners Of The World (Terra Nova CD), 2008
- Petri Kuljuntausta w/ Dario Martinelli: Zoosphere. A Musical Encryptation Of Animal Sounds (CD), 2008
- Petri Kuljuntausta: Emergence (CD), 2013

=== Appears on ===
- V/A: Sound Box 1.0 (Kiasma, CD-ROM, Multimedia), 1998
- V/A: Sound Box 2.0 (Kiasma, CD-ROM, Multimedia), 1999
- V/A: Sounds! (Charm Of Sound, CD compilation), 1999
- V/A: On-Off - Eetteriäänistä Sähkömusiikkiin / On-Off - From Ether Sounds To Electronic Music (Kiasma Records, CD compilation), 2001
- David Rothenberg: Sudden Music (Terra Nova CD), 2002
- Erkki Kurenniemi: Äänityksiä / Recordings 1963-1973 (Love Records, CD), 2002
- David Rothenberg: Why Birds Sing? (Terra Nova, CD), 2005
- Jacques Coelho: Video Works 1993-1996 (KUD, DVD-V), 2006
- V/A: Là-Bas Biennale (Aureobel, Studio Là-bas, CD compilation), 2010
- V/A: Muu For Ears (Muu, CD compilation), 2009
- V/A: Muu For Ears 2 (Muu, CD compilation), 2010
- V/A: Muu For Ears 3 (Muu, CD compilation), 2010
- V/A: Muu For Ears 4 (Muu, CD compilation), 2010
- V/A: Muu For Ears 5 (Muu, CD compilation)
- V/A: Muu For Ears 6 (Muu, CD compilation)
- V/A: Muu For Ears 7 (Muu, CD compilation)
- V/A: Muu For Ears 8 (Muu, CD compilation)
- V/A: Muu For Ears 9 (Muu, CD compilation)
- V/A: Muu For Ears 10 (Muu, CD compilation)
- V/A: Muu For Ears 11 (Muu, CD compilation), 2013
- V/A: Muu For Ears 12 (Muu, CD compilation), 2014

=== Tracks appear on ===
- Charm of Sound on Huygens (ESA European Space Agency / Patagonie, CD-ROM, Multimedia), 1997
- In Spe on Hope (Audio Research Editions, CD), 1998
- Le Train Fântome on Le Train Fântome (Ghost Train) (Éditions Suicide Commercial, CD), 1998
- Momentum on Looper's Delight Compilation CD: Volume 2 (Marathon Records, 2xCD), 1998
- How many does it take... on The Frog Peak Collaborations Project (Frog Peak Music, 2xCD), 1998
- Momentum on European Loop Project - Phase One (Sonnenengel Musik, CD), 1999
- Idea Of Proof on Sounds! (Charm Of Sound, CD), 1999
- The Waiting Room on Sounds! (Charm Of Sound, CD), 1999
- False Step on Trace (Audio Research Editions, 2xCD), 1999
- At The Well on Farm Soundscapes (Earminded, CDr), 2000
- The Milker on Farm Soundscapes (Earminded, CDr), 2000
- XY+Z on Sonic Eye (YLE, HIAP, CD), 2000
- There Was Nothing In The Room on Zero (Audio Research Editions, CD), 2000
- Stelle's Dream on Virtual Zoo (Studio Forum CD), 2001
- This Is Piccadilly Circus on Détonants Voyages (Astonishing Journeys) (Studio Forum, CD), 2003
- Vroom!! on Hearing Place (Move, CD), 2003
- Navigator on Karta/Terräng (Laika CD), 2004
- Tampere03 on FreeJazz.org Sampler Vol. 1 (whi music, MP3 Album), 2005
- Do Not Feed The Artists on New Music Academy Concerts 2004-2005 (Boring Films, 6xDVD-V), 2005
- The Blow on 3 Films (Jinx Ltd, DVD-V), 2006
- Texas Scramble on 3 Films (Jinx Ltd, DVD-V), 2006
- Days on 3 Films (Jinx Ltd, DVD-V), 2006
- Navigator on Belly Of The Whale (Important Records, CD), 2006
- Four Notes on Junction (KUD DVD-V), 2006
- Noise City on Suomalaiset Sävelet, Osa 8 / Finnish Tones, Part 8 (YLE, CD), 2006
- La Planète sauvage on Video Works 1993-1996 (KUD, DVD-V), 2006
- La Planète étrange on Video Works 1993-1996 (KUD, DVD-V), 2006
- Nordic Prince on Yokomono 03: 55 Lock Grooves (Staalplaat, LP), 2006
- Canvas on Clouds Vol. 2 (Ambient Man Presents) (Ambient Man, MP3 album), 2007
- Momentum on Clouds Vol. 2 (Ambient Man Presents) (Ambient Man, MP3 album), 2007
- Kolmest maailma nurgast on Ürgne Kaja (Primal Echo) (Looduse-Sober CD), 2007
- Transmission 42 on Ambient. Volume VIII #2. Radio Sampler (Oasis, CD), 2008
- Canvas on Art On Location. (DVDr), 2008
- Heavy Feather on North South Project (Elektron Records, CD), 2009
- Mexican Cars on Muu For Ears (MUU CD), 2009
- Marquis on Là-Bas Biennale (Aureobel, Studio Là-bas CD), 2010
- Maa all on Improtest 2007/2008 (Improtest Records, CD), 2010
- Water Cities on Muu For Ears 4 (Muu, CD), 2010
- Hailstorm on ...menu for murmur (Chapman Gallery, CD), 2010
- Hailstorm on ...menu for murmur (Chapman Gallery, DVD), 2010

=== Production ===
- Sound Box 1.0 (Kiasma, CD-ROM, Multimedia), 1998
- Sound Box 2.0 (Kiasma, CD-ROM, Multimedia), 1999
- Sounds! (Charm Of Sound, CD compilation), 1999
- On-Off - Eetteriäänistä Sähkömusiikkiin / On-Off - From Ether Sounds To Electronic Music (Kiasma Records, CD compilation), 2001
- Atau Tanaka: Prométhée Numérique (Aureobel, MP3 album with Multimedia), 2005
- If Bwana: Procession Of Shadows (Aureobel, MP3 album with Multimedia), 2005
- Richard Lerman: Within Earreach (Sonic Journeys) (Aureobel, MP3 album with Multimedia), 2005
- Là-Bas Biennale (Aureobel, Studio Là-bas, CD compilation), 2010

Kuljuntausta has also produced and/or mastered (audio post-production) music and sound art works for CD releases at least from the following artists: Gordon Monahan, Francisco López, Jorge Haro, Disinformation, Charlie Morrow, Jimi Tenor, Incite/, Erkki Kurenniemi, Jukka Ruohomäki, Timo Hietala, Juhani Liimatainen, Jarmo Sermilä, Patrick Kosk, Hepa Halme, Nemesis, Juhani Nuorvala, Chris Mann, Urban Shepherds, Dario Martinelli, John Richardson, Jukka Ylitalo, Teemu Ontero, Inéz, Pekka Sirén, Jukka Mikkola, Tom Ahola, Agnieszka Waligórska, Vesa Lahti, Teemu Mäki, Kalev Tiits, Koray Tahiroglu, Shinji Kanki, Reijo Jyrkiäinen, Bengt Johansson, Henrik Otto Donner, Erkki Salmenhaara, Ilkka Kuusisto, Seppo Mustonen, Usko Meriläinen, Pehr Henrik Nordgren, Martti Vuorenjuuri, Veikko Eskolin, RANK Ensemble, Horst Quartet, Grey Park, Täydellisyys, Koelse, Umpio, Kheta Hotem, Tripolar, Gaia B, Alice Evermoore & Eavesdropper, Sami Klemola, Helena Gough, Jean-Marc Savic, Sinebag, Gintas K, Siri Austeen, Pekka Sassi, Olle Essvik, Goodiepal, Marja-Leena Sillanpää, Child of Klang, Åsa Maria Bengtsson, Ida Lundén, Lise-Lotte Norelius, Mikko Maasalo, Juhani Räisänen, Pink Twins, Juha Valkeapää, Pauli Apollo Ahopelto, Pessi Parviainen, Jakob Nordgren, Juan Kasari, Aleksi Keränen, Taito Kantomaa, Janne Jankeri, Jussi Österman, Jukka Rintamäki, Sebastian Lindberg, Sami Pennanen, Sound Meccano & Evgeniy Droomoff, Gas Of Latvia, Andres Lõo, Taavi Tulev, Lauri Dag-Tüür, Arturas Bumsteinas, Antanas Jasenka, Kaspars Groshevs, John Grzinich, Taavi Kerikmäe, Kiwa, Darius Čiuta, Raul Keller, Antireality & Bernurits, Astma, Lina Lapelyté, Martins Rokis, Raimundas Eimontas, Pekka ja Susiluoto, USO, Lau Nau, Tsembla.

== Books by ==
- First Wave. A Microhistory of Early Finnish Electronic Music, 443 pp, Like & Rosebud 2008.
- Äänen eXtreme, 416 pp, Like 2006. (Engl. eXtreme Sound)
- On/Off - eetteriäänistä sähkömusiikkiin, 800 pp, Like & Kiasma 2002. (Engl. On/Off - From Ether Sounds To Electronic Music).

== Articles by ==
- "Live-elektroniikasta ja studiosävellysten esittämisestä" in Heidi Soidinsalo (ed.): Ääneen ajateltua: Kirjoituksia äänestä, esityksestä ja niiden kohtaamisista. Teatterikorkeakoulun julkaisusarja 44, 2014.
- "Tacet. Hiljaisuus soivassa taiteessa" (Engl. Tacet. Silence in Sonic Art) (manuscript).
- "Kuiskauksia ja huutoja", in Ympäristö ja Terveys, 2:2013.
- "Sounds from physicist's laboratory". Erkki Kurenniemi's road as a constructor of electronic music instruments. ArtNord magazine, 2012.
- "Äänellä on värinsä". (Engl. The Sound has Its Colour). Article in the book Korville piirretyt kuvat, commissioned by Radio Theatre / Finnish Broadcasting Company YLE. Publisher: Like Publishing, 2011.
- "Äänitaide ja kaupunkitila" (Engl. Sound Art and City Space), Musiikin Suunta (Finnish Society for Ethnomusicology) 2/2011.
- "Interview with Petri Kuljuntausta" by Dario Martinelli in the book Authenticity, Performance and Other Double-Edged Words, 2010.
- "Äänitaiteen lyhyt sanakirja". Article in Art Fair Suomi 2009 exhibition catalogue. Artists' Association Muu and Union of Artist Photographers and Photographic Gallery Hippolyte. 2009.
- "Those Were The (Radical) Days". Article in Happy Nordic Music Days festival catalogue. Norwegian Society of Composers & Ny Musikk. Oslo. 2009.
- "Composer Petri Kuljuntausta". Article in Kompositio, the magazine of the Society of Finnish Composers. Helsinki 2008.
- "" ". A Writing on Silence". Then The Silence Increased exhibition catalogue. Gwilliam, Ben & Helmut Lemke (editors). University of Salford / A Greater Manchester University, Chapman Gallery, 2007.
- "Linnunlaulun esteettisyyden jäljillä". 2007. (manuscript)
- "Äänen eXtreme ja kritiikki". Finnish Society for Musicology, Musiikki 2007.
- "Going with the flow: compositional and analytical perspectives on soundtracks for experimental films", (with John Richardson). In the book Richardson, John and Stan Hawkins (ed.): Essays on Sound and Vision. Helsinki University Press / Yliopistopaino. Helsinki 2006.
- "Uljas Uusi Äänimaailma". Ympäristöäänet, äänimaisemat ja radiotehosteet virikkeiden antajina 1950-60-lukujen suomalaisessa akustisessa taiteessa. In book Kuultava menneisyys (Kaarina Kilpiö ja Outi Ampuja, edit.). Turun historiallinen yhdistys, Historia Mirabilis 3. Turku. 2005.
- "Kanneltalon elektro ja Helsinki-elektron ensiaskeleet". In book Kulttuurikeskus kohtauspaikkana, edit. Timo Cantell, Maaria Linko ja Satu Silvanto. Helsingin Tieke ja Helsingin kultturiasiainkeskus. Helsinki. 2005.
- "Sulla musica acusmatica, acustica e sulle interpretazioni della musica digitale". In festival catalogue 1° Festival di Musica Acusmatica, s. 23–26. Amici Della Musica di Cagliari. Italy. 2004.
- "Somewhere between drama and music". Finnish radiophonic music from its beginnings to the digital age. Finnish Music Quarterly 1/2004.
- "Äänimaiseman ulottuvuuksia". Korvien puhdistamisesta urbaaniin noiseen, Nuori Voima 1/2004.
- "Finnish Sound Art". In catalogue of the Blind Sight sound art exhibition. Centerspace VRC, Dundee Scotland & Titanik gallery, Turku. 2004.
- "Äänitaiteen ja elektronimusiikin extreme", AVEK magazine 2/2003.
- "The Decade of The Beep", FrameNews 2/2002. Art Exchange Center Frame, 2002.
- "The First Finnish Electronic Compositions". Internet article. Kiasma 2002.
- "Soivan taiteen jäljillä" and Sonic Boom, Kuva magazine 6/2000.
- "‘Charm of Sound': Something new in the Finnish contemporary music scene?", Organised Sound 1997 Vol. 2, no. 1. Cambridge University Press. England 1997.
- "Semiotiikka, muutoksen logiikka, improvisaatio ja hypermusiikki: musiikin semioottis-looginen analyysimalli", Finnish Society for Musicology, Musiikki magazine 1996:4.
- "Äänten taide", writing in Lux sonor exhibition catalogue. Helsinki Kunsthalle, 1995.
- "Improvisointi ja kulttuuri", Finnish Society for Ethnomusicology, Musiikin suunta 1995 (Vol. 17 / No. 4).
- "Paradigmaattisen analyysin mahdollisuudet", Finnish Society for Ethnomusicology, Etnomusikologian vuosikirja Vol. 6 (1994).
- "Jazzin määrittelystä", Finnish Society for Ethnomusicology, Musiikin suunta 1992 (Vol. 14 / No. 1)
