= Fanny Simonsen =

French soprano singer (1835–1896)

Fanny Simonsen (née Françoise De Haes or Dehaes; c. 1835 – 19 September 1896), also written Fannie Simonsen, was a French soprano singer who had a substantial career on the Australian stage, later a concert manager with her violinist husband Martin Simonsen (c. 1829 – 28 November 1899). Several daughters and one grand-daughter, Frances Alda, were first-rate singers.

== History ==
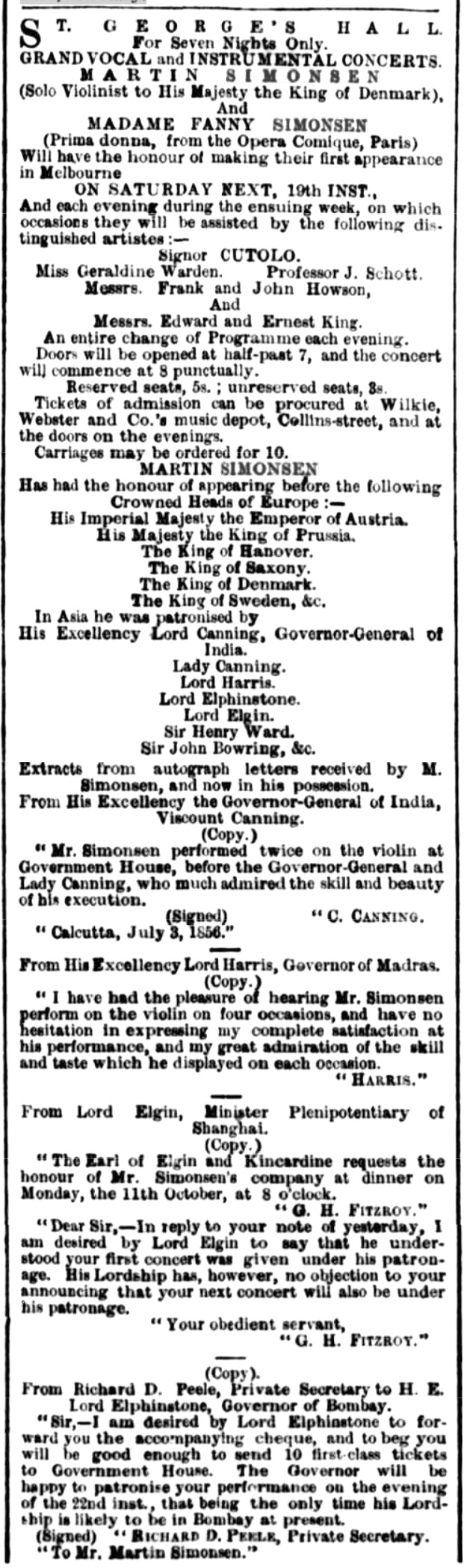
The Simonsens' first Australian advertisement

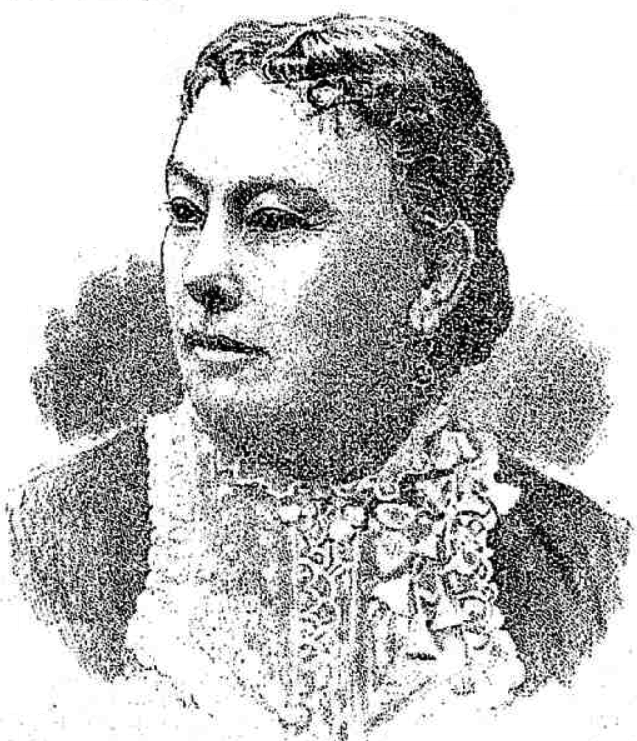
Fanny Simonsen 1890

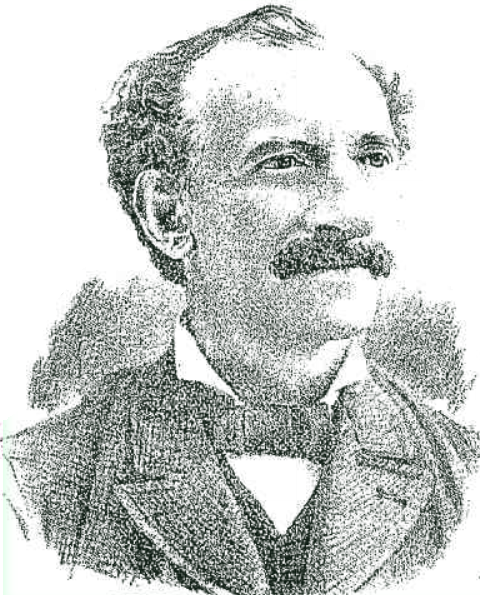
Martin Simonsen c. 1889

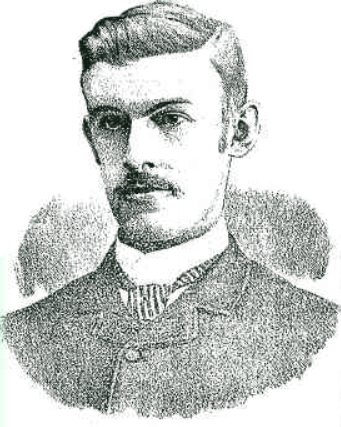
Jules Simonsen c. 1890

Born Françoise De Haes or Dehaes, Fanny Simonsen was a French lyric soprano, who claimed aristocratic parentage and had studied under Manuel Garcia II. She had on occasion shared the Paris stage with Madame Carvalho, and played prima donna roles in Brussels and the great French provincial cities. She married the eminent Danish violinist Martin Simonsen, and for nine years restricted her appearances to the concert stage in Europe and California.

The Simonsens arrived in Melbourne from Germany in August 1865 by the mail steamer Northam after a successful tour of China and India, and held a series of seven concerts at St George's Hall, Bourke Street, Melbourne, from Saturday 19 August 1865, with a different program every night.

In June 1866 Mme Simonsen joined Lyster's Grand Opera Company as prima donna, commencing with Donizetti's Lucia di Lammermoor. This was followed by Meyerbeer's Les Huguenots (as Marguerite de Valois), the Australian première of L'Africaine (alternately with Lucy Escott, playing Selika), perhaps her most celebrated role) and Roberto il diavolo, perhaps their most popular production (as Isabel/Isabelle). In 1867 she played the name part in Maritana (Wallace), Amina in La Sonnambula (Bellini) and Auber's comic operas The Crown Diamonds as Catarina and Masaniello as Elvira. Despite Lyster's alternation of loss-making grand opera productions with crowd-pleasing comic offerings, his attention to detail and the quality of his orchestra and ensemble and stars Simonsen and Lucy Escott, Henry Squires and Armes Beaumont, he was failing in a business sense due to the public demand for novelty. Accordingly, he announced his intention to withdraw from Melbourne, which compounded the problem. After the troupe's tour of country Victoria — Ballarat Geelong and Bendigo — and before they crossed over to Adelaide, the Simonsens made their own farewell tour and returned to San Francisco; Geraldine Warden was Lyster's new soprano.

They returned to Melbourne by the Marpesia in July 1869 and held a short series of concerts at the Academy of Music (Princess's Theatre on Spring Street), and the goldfield towns, supported by Rebecca Nordt (soprano), Arthur R. Moule (tenor) and Harcourt Lee (bass and pianist).

In January 1868 Lyster brought to Melbourne (fresh from South America): Vitali, Devoti, Bertolini, and the magnificent basso profundo D'Antoni/De Antoni. prima donna is Signora Ida Vitali and her husband, baritone Giuseppe Bertolini; second prima donna, Marinette Colombo; tenor, Signor Ugo De Voti; basso, Signor Pietro d'Antoni.
Lyster took a company to San Francisco in the Alexander Duthie in August 1868; it was a failure from the start: Antoni died on the voyage there; Kitts' voice failed, the weather was foul and fear of earthquake kept many away. Escott and Squires left Lyster's company while in America, as did Beaumont, and the rest returned via New Zealand.)

Far from quitting the Melbourne musical scene, in 1869 Lyster formed a partnership with John Washington Smith, previously of Lenton & Smith, to establish, in January 1870, an Italian Opera Company with Lucia Baratti, Lucy Chambers, Mariano Neri (tenor), Enrico Dondi (basso). Simonsen and Beaumont were among their first recruits. Another prominent member of the company was Signor Leandro Coy, whose family contributed much to Melbourne's music scene.

In later years Lyster suffered from a chronic illness, and despite a trip to Europe for treatment died on 27 November 1880.

Simonsen's first appearance for this season was as Lucia in Lucia di Lammermoor on 10 February 1870, followed by Un Ballo in Maschera, Maritana, Il Barbiere di Siviglia, Martha (as Lady Harriet) and others. In May 1871 the Simonsens had a farewell tour of the major towns of Victoria and South Australia, having announced their leaving the country. On 19 August 1871 the Simonsen troupe, consisting of Rebecca Nordt, her husband Arthur Moule (tenor), Edward Farley (baritone), Barry O'Neil (comic singer), Henry King (pianist) held a concert at the Lyceum Theatre prior to leaving for Europe. The programme included Offenbach's The Rose of Auvergne, or, Spoiling the Broth and the first act of Verdi's Il Trovatore. Their farewell tour included New Zealand, and dragged on to September 1872.

The Simonsens returned to Melbourne aboard the Norfolk in January 1876 and staged a couple of concerts at the Town Hall which were very well received by the few who attended. They also performed at the Metropolitan Liedertafel, held that same week. They assembled an opera company of some 40 or 50 singers to tour Victoria and New Zealand; they had brought with them a full wardrobe and scores for a hundred operas, some new to the colonies. She appeared at Melbourne's new Opera House (on Bourke Street) for Lyster in February 1876, alternating with Ilma De Murska, who appeared in Lucia and Sonnambula while Simonsen had The Grand Duchess of Gerolstein and Maritana. In March the Simonsens' Royal English Opera Company, of around 40 performers left for a tour of New Zealand. In Dunedin they played The Hermit's Bell and Lecocq's La fille de Madame Angot, and were received well despite having no recognised names apart from Simonsen. At Christchurch they performed Martha and at Wellington Lucia di Lammermoor, Martha, La Sonnambula and Auber's Carlo Broschi. The highly successful tour concluded at Invercargill in November 1876. The pianist, C. B. Foster (1853–1894), was praised. The Simonsen Opera Company (or Royal English and Opera Bouffe Company) embarked on a tour of south-western Victoria and across the border to Mount Gambier and another extended tour of Tasmania. In May 1877, after a year of frustration in not being able to hire a hall in Melbourne, Martin Simonsen announced his taking over the lease of St George's Hall to establish it as an English Opera House. While noting the unsuitability of the hall for opera — its lack of depth, so most of the audience were too close to the tiny stage, and insufficient volume for decent acoustics — the first offerings, Balfe's opera Satanella, in which Minna Fischer made her Melbourne debut, and Flotow's Martha were well received. The first season concluded with The Hermit's Bell, Maritana, Giroflé-Girofla, The Bohemian Girl and The Grand Duchess, with smaller audiences. For the 1878 season the Simonsens leased the Prince of Wales Opera House, a much more suitable venue, also on Bourke Street. Works included Die Fledermaus, The Hermit's Bell, Satanella, The Bohemian Girl, The Grand Duohess, Giroflé-Girofla, Maritana and Der Freischütz. Camille Dubois and C. H. Taylor joined Amy Sherwin, Minna Fischer and the rest of the cast. This was Armes Beaumont's last appearance before leaving for Europe and Fanny Simonsen's second announcement of her retirement.

Simonsen's daughters Leonora and Martina made their stage debut at the Mechanics' Institute, Ballarat, in December 1879. In September 1880 Martina joined her mother's Royal English & Italian Opera Company of some 50 members, which included Martin Simonsen as conductor, Carrie Godfrey, Eugenie Dehaes, (Note: A niece? The coincidence of her and Madame Simonsen's birth surnames was not remarked on by contemporary newspapers.) tenors Pietro Paladini and Gaetano Bianchi, and basses Ernest St Clair and Tom Riccardi. "Frances Saville", whose status as Simonsen's third daughter was not revealed, joined the company in 1882 for a 10-week season at the Gaiety Theatre, Sydney in 1882, when one critic commented on the daughters' German accent. They played at the Theatre Royal, Adelaide, in August and September to good and appreciative houses for ten different works, Un Ballo perhaps making the greatest impression. A feature was the company's first staging of Von Suppé's Boccaccia, translated from the German by Dexter Smith. (Note: Dexter Smith (c. 1838 Salem – 1910 Boston, Mass.) was composer of "Put Me in My Little Bed" etc.) The newly-reopened Theatre Royal, Hobart, followed in October, and again Boccaccio was a "hit". Fanny Simonsen finally quit the stage on 22 September 1884, but continued to give singing lessons at her home in St Kilda.

Martin Simonsen continued concert management, bringing out the New Royal Italian Opera Company in 1886, whose stars included the bassos Tomaso De Alba and Attilio Buzzi and baritones Warwick Gainor and Achille Rebottaro and his sister Alice Rebottaro. In 1888 he brought out a troupe known as the "Spanish Students (Note: "Spanish Students" refers to an artistic tradition where the performers emulate impoverished students, wearing a three-cornered hat bearing a spoon, in readiness for a free bowl of soup.) and Spanish Dancers", whose premiere on 8 September 1888 was described by a newspaper critic as a failure: the large and expectant audience was treated to a concert of mostly unfamiliar tunes and songs in a language which, though performed superbly, was unintelligible to most. The dancers were described as heavy-hoofed and immodestly dressed, an affront to the audience's sense of decency. The critique concluded with "Indeed, most of them appeared to be glad when it was over." Around the same time Martin Simonsen had in Sydney an Italian troupe starring Lilian Tree and Giuseppe Pimazzoni, which had to be disbanded due to personal difficulties. His losses were substantial, and in February 1889 he filed for insolvency, his chief debtor being his wife. In 1891 husband and wife imported the Italian Opera Company, which opened with Il Trovatore at the Alexandra Theatre on 8 August. This was poorly attended and the tour cancelled; another financial blow. Inclement weather and the depressed economic climate were blamed, but a more likely cause was the opera's refined artistry and lack of well-known stars, as more prosaic entertainments nearby were doing well.

Henry Bracy, in conjunction with Johnny Solomon, took over many of the Simonsen artists to form his own company.

== Last Years ==
The Simonsens brought several Italian opera troupes to Australia which lost them a great deal of money. They also lost money on their Spanish Students scheme. Mme Simonsen brought in a little money as a singing tutor at their Carlisle Street, St Kilda, home. She died aged 61, as the result of an apoplectic fit shortly before midnight on 19 September 1896. She had a similar seizure some eleven years earlier but otherwise had enjoyed good health. In her last moments she requested that the score of Faust should be buried with her, which was carried out at the St Kilda Cemetery on 20 September 1896.

After Mme Simonsen's death Mr Simonsen lived as a boarder with a Mrs Goulding (another source says Mr. and Mrs. Dunning) at 588 Elizabeth Street, Melbourne. Three years later, nearly deaf and blind and suffering from rheumatism, he died in his upstairs room of a self-inflicted pistol shot.

== Students ==
A list of Fanny Simonsen's pupils includes Ada Crossley, Lillie Crowle, Ada Prull, Flora Graupner, Julia Simmons, Muriel Walsh, Jeanne Ramsay, Emilie Lambert and her own children: Frances Simonsen (known as "Frances Saville", see below), Martina Simonsen and Jules Simonsen, and presumably her granddaughter Frances Alda, whom she brought up from the age of five. Crossley was arguably her most important pupil — she would travel from her country home to St Kilda twice weekly for lessons, until Simonsen agreed to take her as a boarder, a situation which lasted two or three years. Crossley recognised the benefit she gained by living in the musical home after Madame Simonsen's death by contributing £50 towards her headstone.

== Martin Simonsen compositions ==
Martin Simonsen composed for solo violin:

- Victoria Galop
- Melbourne Polka
- Remembrances of Germany Oberland or Souvenir d'Allemagne
- Life on the Ocean fantasia on English and Irish airs

== Family ==
Martin Simonsen (30 January 1830 – 28 November 1899) married Françoise Geanine "Fanny" De Haes (c. 1835 – 19 September 1896). Their eleven children, of whom two, perhaps three, were born before arriving in Australia, included:

- Eldest daughter Leonora Martina "Leo" Simonsen (24 November 1859 – 27 December 1884) was born in Monte Video. Of undoubted musical ability, she made her operatic debut with that of her sister Martine at the Melbourne Town Hall on 10 July 1880, and toured America with her father. She was a rising prima donna on 18 October 1876 when she married David Davis (born c. 1852) at the synagogue, Christchurch, New Zealand. She returned to Australia in July 1879, followed a month later by her husband. A year later she divorced him on the grounds of cruelty and adultery (he was suffering from "a certain illness", presumably syphilis). They had two children:

- Hyam Albert Davis was born on 8 September 1877.
- Frances Jane "Fanny" Davis (31 May 1879 – 18 September 1952) was born in New Zealand, renamed Frances "Francie" Adler after her mother's remarriage, and grew up with grandmother Simonsen after her mother's death. She sang with the "Gay Parisienne" Company, then by 1903 had, at the instigation of Madame Marchesi, adopted Frances Alda as her stage name, and 1883 as her year of birth. A famous racehorse, F.J.A., was named for her. She sang at "The Met" 1908–9, married Giulio Gatti-Casazza, divorced 1941, became a US citizen, married mining/advertising executive Ray VirDen (3 December 1895, Wheeler, Indiana – 27 November 1955) on 14 April 1941.
In 1883 she left with her children for San Francisco where on 3 January 1884 she married again, to Herman Adler. She died of peritonitis at her home in San Francisco. Her father, who was in New York when she took ill, was present when she died, aged 25.

- Martina Simonsen (c. 1861 – 4 April 1953) married George Schreiber on 30 April 1886.
- Third daughter Fanny Simonsen (6 January 1865 – 8 November 1935) married theatrical manager John Saville Smith on 18 July 1881 and adopted the stage name Frances Saville. She divorced him in September 1887, married Max Rown (1850 – 15 September 1917) on 16 March 1888. In 1891 she left for Paris for coaching (unnecessarily in the opinion of at least one critic) by Melba's tutor, Mathilde Marchesi. She was for a time the prima donna of the Grand Opera House, Brussels, and also gained recognition in London, Paris, Vienna, St Petersburg, and New York. She retired in California and never returned to Australia.
- Jules Simonsen (2 April 1867 – ) was a tenor vocalist on the Rickards circuit, then left for San Francisco, where he had a "chequered career".
- Hermann Martin Simonsen (2 March 1869 – c. March 1952), usually written "Herman", married (Lillian) Beatrice Webb on 4 October 1900. He was a wholesale jeweller in Melbourne, found bankrupt in 1932. Died at Deepdene, Victoria.
- Fourth son Albert Martin Simonsen (26 January 1871 – 9 January 1915) married Maud Whyte on 11 July 1900
- Youngest daughter Florence Martin "Florrie" Simonsen ( – c. 27 August 1913) married Arthur Turrall (c. 1863 – 19 November 1903) on 12 June 1895, home "Abbotsford", Cotham Road, Kew, Victoria. Arthur committed suicide by poison. Florrie Simonsen was a well-known soprano.
- Martin Simonsen (10 December 1878 – 14 August 1953) married Marriette Evelyn "Cis" Courgeau (?) (died 16 June 1912). He married again, to Ida
- William Simonsen, stage name Louis Saville, also a singer, married with children, joined the British army and was at the Front in 1917.

several sons were at the front in WWI. More information is needed.

They had a home "Cambo", on Carlisle Street, St Kilda, Victoria.
