= Alfred Anderson (pianist) =

Australian pianist

Alfred Anderson (c. January 1848 – 22 March 1876) was an Australian pianist of Jewish extraction who had a promising career but died young. He married the soprano Ilma de Murska shortly before his death.

== History ==
Anderson was the son of James Henri Anderson (1823 – 1 May 1879), an accomplished musician who styled himself "professor of music", and his wife Rachael Anderson (c. 1831 – 22 December 1877). J. H. Anderson had arrived in Launceston in 1842 and around 1846 moved to Hobart, where Alfred was born. The lad early showed promise of musical excellence: at age 5½ Tasmanian newspapers were hailing him as a "musical wonder", and such illustrious men as Sir William Denison and Colonel Butterworth as well as actual musical authorities, were extolling his virtues. His family moved to Melbourne, then to Geelong, and George Coppin hired him for stage performances. He continued to make progress, tutored by his father and by Charles S. Packer the Sydney conductor. In 1857 he was admitted as a student by the Royal Academy of Music, In 1867 his "Royal Quadrilles" were dedicated to and performed for H.R.H. the Duke of Edinburgh on the occasion of his visit to Sydney. He studied at the Royal Academy of Music under Ernst Pauer, returning to Sydney in July 1869.

=== Marriage and death ===
Anderson was a member of Lyster's concert troupe to New Zealand, whose star was the "Polish Nightingale" Ilma de Murska. The two were married in Sydney on 29 December 1875. She was obliged to break her schedule a few weeks later in Melbourne, as her husband was gravely ill. As a result, her fans in that city were treated to additional performances, in Lucia di Lammermoor and La Sonnambula, alternating nights with Fannie Simonsen. Anderson, who had been suffering intermittently before the marriage, died on 22 March at his father's house, 1 Lansdowne Terrace, East Melbourne.

De Murska married again, two months later, on 15 May 1876, while on tour in Dunedin, New Zealand, to John Hill, a friend and colleague of Anderson.

=== Controversy ===
Anderson's estate, valued at £2,300 (many millions in today's currency), was by his will dated 26 February 1876 left to his mother. Allegations were made that much of this sum had been the property of De Murska, and became his through marriage, as the Married Woman’s Property Act was at that time. Anderson's father was accused by the Melbourne press of preventing De Murska from visiting her husband, strongly denied by J. H. Anderson. Some years later, the New York Sun published (Murska's manager) De Vivo's account of "the old Jewish father" barring her way with his cane.

== Published compositions ==
- Anderson, Alfred; Wallace, William Vincent, 1812-1865. Lurline (1860), Star of love : valse de salon on favourite themes from Lurline, J.H. Anderson
- Anderson, Alfred (1860), The Challenger galop, J.H. Anderson & Son
- Anderson, Alfred (1864), The Sydney polka, J.H. Anderson
- Thee, J. H; Anderson, Alfred, 1848-1876 (1864), The New England polka, J.H. Anderson
- Anderson, Alfred (1866), The Belmore galop (5th. ed.), J. H. Anderson
- Anderson, Alfred; Fischer, J. N (1867), The Queen's own galop, J.H. Anderson & Son
- More details at National Library of Australia: Anderson, Alfred (1848-1876)
