= Winnipeg's Most =

Canadian hip-hop group

- Origin: Winnipeg, Manitoba, Canada
- Genre: Hip hop
- Years active: 2010–2012, 2024–present
- Label: Heatbag Records/RezOfficial Music
- Members: Charlie Fettah; Jon-C
- Past members: Brooklyn

Winnipeg's Most is a Canadian hip hop group, made up of the MC's Jon-C (Billy Pierson), Charlie Fettah (Tyler Rogers), and formerly, Brooklyn (Jamie Prefontaine). They were based in the city of Winnipeg, Manitoba. Jon-C and Brooklyn are both Aboriginal artists, and the group was featured in the Canadian Broadcasting Corporation documentary series 8th Fire. The group released two albums and a number of singles and videos, some of which were played on MuchMusic. The group won several Aboriginal Peoples Choice Music Awards in 2010, including the award for Best New Artist, and they won six APCMA's in 2011.

== History ==
=== Northside Connection ===
In early June 2010, Winnipeg's Most released their first project to the public: a pre-album promotional mixtape titled Northside Connection. The mixtape featured artists Blu, Ed E Buk, Zeek Illa, Bubblz, and Ladee Seduction (Jessica Bro-Z). Next, the group released two singles to the Winnipeg radio station Streetz FM: "All That I Know" and "On These Streets." These songs hit number one on the station's top 10 chart, and the mixtape was downloaded thousands of times. These initial singles spawned videos directed by Stuey Kubrick and received airplay on Canada's Much Music.

=== Self titled debut ===
For their debut album, Winnipeg's Most collaborated with the Juno nominated producers Stomp and Jay Mak of RezOfficial Music. The album was released in 2010 under the group's own label, Heatbag Records, in association with RezOfficial Music. The album featured Kobe, Ed E Buk, and Zeek Illa, and it featured the hit songs "All That I Know", "On These Streetz", and "What You In It For". Boogey the Beat co-produced one track with Stomp, titled "It's A Jungle Out Here". The group won 3 out of the 4 Aboriginal Peoples Choice Music Awards that they were nominated for.

=== Goodfellaz ===
Winnipeg's Most released their sophomore album under their label Heatbag Records in 2011. This record, titled Goodfellaz, featured artists Krizz Kaliko, The Rupness Monster, Ed E Buk, Zeek Illa, Bubblz, Big Slim, and Inez. This album won six Aboriginal Peoples Choice Music Awards in the categories of Best Duo or Group, Best Producer/Engineer, Best Music Video, Best Album Cover Design, Best Rap/Hip-hop CD, and Single of the Year for "Don't Stop".

=== Disbandment and death of Brooklyn ===
Winnipeg's Most disbanded after 2013. Jon-C was arrested that year after cocaine and other drugs were found in his home during a 2012 police raid. On September 22, 2015, Jamie Prefontaine (aka Brooklyn), died at the age of 30.

=== 2024 reunion show ===
On March 28, 2024, at the Burton Cummings theatre in Winnipeg, the surviving member's of Winnipeg's Most performed a reunion show, which included in a tribute to Prefontaine (also known as Brooklyn). Additionally, Rogers announced plans on his personal Instagram page for following unspecified shows to be performed in the summer of 2024.

== Heatbag Records ==
Heatbag Records was operated by the three members of Winnipeg's Most. Under this label, the group has released work by Bubblz, Ashley Blakk, the Rupness Monster, Blu, Zeek Illa n the River City Knight Ryderz, Jay Bird, Stattis, Lady Seduction, Drezus, Kid P, KiDD Kane and Charlie Stumble.

=== Heatbag releases ===
- Brooklyn - Mind of a Heatbag (2009)
- Charlie Fettah - Speak No Evil (2009)
- Jon-C - Da General: Blood, Sweat & Tears (2009)
- Bubblz - Self Portrait (2009)
- Winnipeg's Most - Northside Connection (2010)
- Winnipeg's Most - Goodfellaz (2011)
- Kidd Kane & Cypha Diaz - Chicken & Chocolate Milk (2011)
- Bubblz - Untitled (2011)
- Jon-c & Blu - Tha link (2013)

== Discography ==
- Northside Connection (Mixtape) (2010)
- Winnipeg's Most (2010)
- Goodfellaz (2011)

== Singles ==
Year	Song	Streetz FM	Album
2010	"On These Streets" ft. Kobe	1	Winnipeg's Most
2010	"What You In It For"	1	Winnipeg's Most
2010	"Bang Bang"	2	Winnipeg's Most
2011	"Don't Stop" ft. Tha Rupness Monstah	2	Winnipeg's Most

== Awards and nominations ==
- 2009 APCMA "Best New Artist" – Jon-C Blood Sweat & Tears – Nominated
- 2009 APCMA "Best Rap/Hip-Hop CD" – Jon-C Blood Sweat & Tears – Nominated
- 2009 APCMA "Best Album Cover Design" – Jon-C Blood Sweat & Tears – Nominated
- 2009 APCMA "Single of the Year" – Brooklyn – "Badass Shorty" – Nominated
- 2010 APCMA "Single of the Year" – All That I Know – Nominated
- 2010 APCMA "Best Duo or Group" – Winner
- 2010 APCMA "Best Rap/Hip-Hop CD" – Winnipegs Most – Winner
- 2010 APCMA "Best New Artist" – Winner
- 2011 APCMA "Single of the Year" – Don't Stop – Winner
- 2011 APCMA "Best Duo or Group" – Winner
- 2011 APCMA "Best Music Video" – All That I Know – Winner
- 2011 APCMA "Best Producer/Engineer" – Winner
- 2011 APCMA "Best Rap/Hip-Hop CD" – GoodFellaz – Winner
- 2011 APCMA "Best Album Cover Design" – GoodFellaz – Winner

=== Accolades ===
- "Best Winnipeg Record Label-HEATBAG RECORDS-" - Uptown Magazine 2010
- "Best Winnipeg Record Label-HEATBAG RECORDS-" - Uptown Magazine 2011
- "Best New Band - Winnipeg's Most -Uptown Magazine 2011
- "Best New Cd - Goodfellaz - -Uptown Magazine 2011
- "Best Hip Hop Artist/ Group Winnipeg's Most -Uptown Magazine 2011-
