= John Hill (conductor) =

Australian organist, and choirmaster

John Thomas Hill KS RAM (c. 1843 – ) was a church organist, choirmaster and orchestra conductor in Australia. He is remembered for his brief marriage to the prima donna Ilma de Murska.

== History ==
Hill entered the Royal Academy of Music in 1857 and was elected King's Scholar in 1860 and was subsequently appointed to Her Majesty's private band. He also served as pianist and organist of the Royal Italian Opera at Covent Garden. He was organist of St Patrick's pro-Cathedral and assistant organist of St George's Cathedral, Southwark.

He emigrated to Australia, arriving in Sydney around 1 January 1865, and advertised his availability as a finishing tutor. His first concert was on 13 March 1865 at the Australian Library, Bent Street, Sydney, which was a resounding success despite the absence of the violinist John Hall. (Note: Some contemporary press reports confuse Hill with John Hall, whose full name was John Thomson Hall, a virtuoso violinist contracted to the Lyster Opera Troupe as orchestra leader and accompanist for Ilma de Murska's Australian tour, and was professionally associated with Anderson, to whom she was briefly married.)

He played duets on violin and harmonium in a Soirée Musicale in July 1866."Soirée Musicale". The Sydney Morning Herald. Vol. LIV, no. 8792. New South Wales, Australia. 27 July 1866. p. 4 – via National Library of Australia. As a "gentleman amateur", he played in duets with G. F. Beaumont, also on harmonium, in grand concert March 1867, and played violin in duet with Alfred Anderson's piano in October 1869.

William J. Cordner died in 1870, and Hill was appointed organist and choirmaster of St Mary's pro-Cathedral in his place. He felt the need for a better instrument than the "poor harmonium" he inherited, a legacy of the (twice) destruction of the cathedral; also the lack of discipline in the choir. Accordingly, he drew up a set of rules for the choristers and approached the Church for funds for an instrument, with which the Catholic press concurred. Hill organised a great concert on 16 May 1871 in aid of the St Mary's organ fund at the Freemasons' Hall, at which he and the choir performed Rossini's Stabat Mater to excellent reviews. He organised another on 12 June, which was poorly attended and failed to impress the critics. The Catholic press made no mention of this concert, and no further mention of St Mary's choir, Hill or the organ fund.

Hill was involved in a benefit to the widowed Mrs Cordner in 1870, giving him an opportunity to display his mastery of the pianoforte in a most difficult piece. Mrs Cordner was herself a contralto of the highest calibre. He was a successful music teacher — John A. Delany was a student. Delany, who had also studied under Cordner, succeeded Hill as organist of St Mary's pro-Cathedral in 1872 or earlier.

On 29 December 1875 Ilma de Murska married Hill's friend, the pianist Alfred Anderson. Anderson died 22 March 1876, and within two months, on 15 May 1876, while on tour in Dunedin, New Zealand, Murska married again, to Hill. who went by the name Strauss Illa for this tour, and on her Hobart concert on return to Australia from New Zealand.

When Murska left for America in October 1876 Hill did not follow. This reference is ambiguous as to whether he remained in Australia or New Zealand. Another asserts that (in 1900) Hill was living in America.

In 1881 he was, as John Hillier, conductor at Strand Theatre, London. He produced Manola in 1882 In 1883 he was musical director of Avenue Theatre, London.

De Murska died on 14 January 1889. That same year Hill and Dan Godfrey, jun. founded the London Military Band; he left for America in 1890, leaving Godfrey as manager.

Further details, including place and date of his death have not yet been found.
