= Inez De Florio-Hansen =

German applied linguist and educational psychologist

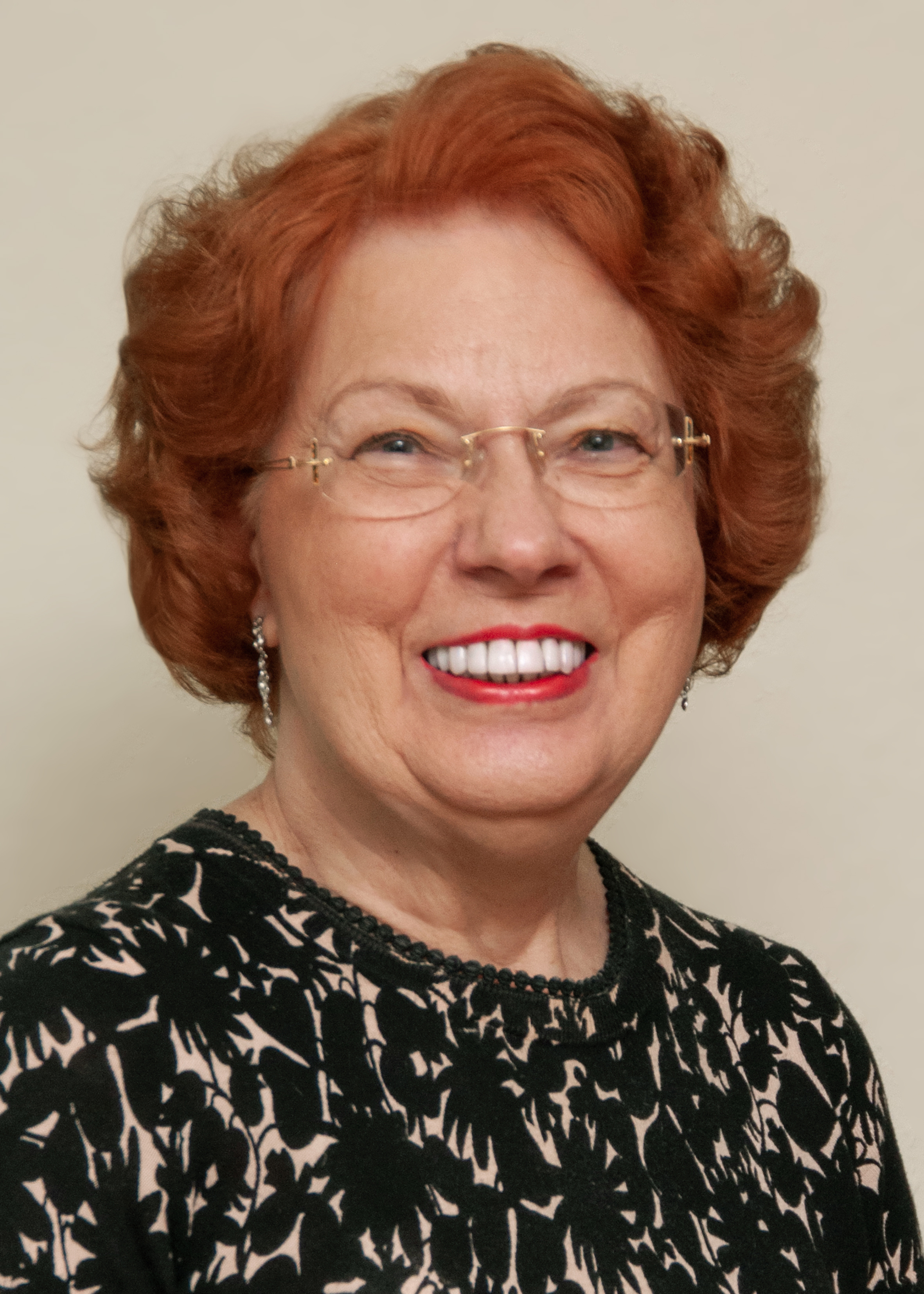
Inez De Florio-Hansen (2021)

Inez De Florio (born 1943) is a German applied linguist and educational psychologist whose work focuses on science-oriented teaching and learning with particular reference to multilingualism and intercultural competence. She is a proponent of (qualitative and quantitative) empirical research. Above all, her critical view of evidence-based education leads her to a particular focus on individual aspects of teachers, learners and their learning contexts.

In her introduction to Teaching and Learning English in the Digital Age (2018), she exemplifies how digital media can be implemented in foreign language classrooms. Furthermore, she shows that digitization's rapidly increasing influence will inevitably lead to more internationalized and globalized research-orientated teaching and learning approaches.

Recently, she has focused on newer teaching methods and different feedback forms.

== Career ==
After graduating from university, De Florio taught foreign languages at the secondary school level and in adult education. She then worked for the Ministry of Education (German State of Hesse) as an advisor and teacher trainer for instructors of migrant students.

She received her Ph.D. in Literature from the University of Aachen in Germany in 1970. Her post-doctoral thesis (Habilitation) at Goethe University in Frankfurt was an empirical study of vocabulary acquisition by adult learners. After having taught at various German universities, she held a chair as Professor of Applied Linguistics at the University of Erfurt, Germany, between 1994 and 1996. In 1996, she continued as a Professor in the Department of Humanities at the University of Kassel, Germany, retiring in 2008.

== Publications ==
De Florio-Hansen has published a variety of books, more than a hundred and seventy featured articles, and a series of textbooks. Among her well-known publications in English are her volume on Effective Teaching and Successful Learning published by Cambridge University Press in 2016 as well as her newest release (2018) about the use of digital tools and the promotion of media competence in combination with reliable methods.

In 2011, she was honored with a Festschrift covering many fields of her research.

=== Selected publications (in English) ===
- De Florio, Inez (2023): From Assessment to Feedback. Applications in the second/foreign language classroom. Cambridge/New York: Cambridge University Press.
- De Florio-Hansen, Inez (2018): Teaching and Learning English in the Digital Age. New York/Münster: Waxmann (UTB).
- De Florio, Inez (2016): Effective Teaching and Successful Learning. Bridging the Gap between Research and Practice. Cambridge/New York: Cambridge University Press.
- De Florio-Hansen, Inez (2013): Translation Competence in Foreign Language Learning. Can Language Methodology benefit from Translation Studies? In: Journal of Linguistics and Language Teaching (JLLT online), 1-29.
- De Florio-Hansen, Inez (2011): How migrant students of Turkish origin perceive their school and family contexts. In: De Florio-Hansen, Inez (ed.): Towards Multilingualism and the Inclusion of Cultural Diversity. Kassel: kassel university press, 99-128.
- De Florio-Hansen, Inez (2011): Introduction. In: De Florio-Hansen, Inez (ed.): Towards Multilingualism and the Inclusion of Cultural Diversity. Kassel: kassel university press, 7-18.
- De Florio-Hansen, Inez (ed.) (2011): Towards Multilingualism and the Inclusion of Cultural Diversity. Kassel: kassel university press.
- De Florio-Hansen, Inez (2009): How to Become a Successful Language Learner. Autonomy, Styles and Strategies Revisited. In: Fremdsprachen und Hochschule 81, 9-40 (reprint from DIL Dergisi 133/2007, 29-59).
- De Florio-Hansen, Inez (2006): Online versus Onsite Learning? Insights into Computer-Based University Courses in Foreign Language Pedagogy. In: Fremdsprachen und Hochschule 77, 9-32.
- De Florio-Hansen, Inez/Warschauer, Mark (2003). Multilingualism, Identity, and the Internet. In: De Florio-Hansen, Inez/Hu, Adelheid (eds.): Plurilingualität und Identität. Zur Selbst- und Fremdwahrnehmung mehrsprachiger Menschen. Tübingen: Stauffenburg, 155-179.
