= Edwin Adams (actor) =

American actor

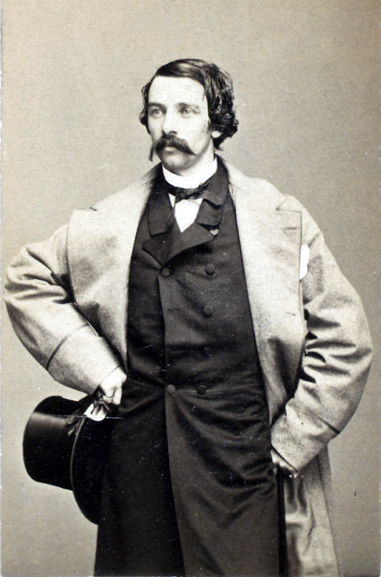
- Born: February 3, 1834; Medford, Massachusetts
- Died: October 28, 1877 (aged 43); Philadelphia, Pennsylvania
- Occupation: Stage actor
- Years active: 1853–1876

Edwin Adams (February 3, 1834 – October 28, 1877) was an American stage actor. Born in Medford, Massachusetts, he made his stage debut in Boston in 1853. He first came to prominence as a leading actor in Baltimore and Philadelphia in 1860. He was considered one of America's great leading actors of the 19th century in both comedic and dramatic parts. His career ended after he became seriously ill during a tour to Australia in 1875. His health never completely recovered, and he made his final appearance at the California Theatre in San Francisco in 1876. He died a year later.

== Life and career ==
Edwin Adams was born in Medford, Massachusetts on February 3, 1834. " He worked "at a mechanical trade in Boston" before he became an actor.

Adams began his career on the stage as Stephen in James Sheridan Knowles's The Hunchback, at the National Theatre in Boston in 1853. He first came to prominence on the American stage in 1860 at the St. Charles Theatre in Baltimore and the Walnut Street Theatre in Philadelphia where he gained a reputation as one of America's great leading male actors. That year he appeared in Hamlet with Kate Josephine Bateman. He later appeared with Bateman in The Serf in 1865, and The Dead Heart, Wild Oats, The Lady of Lyons, Narcisse, and The Marble Heart.

Adams made his debut on the New York stage as New York debut as Sir Thomas Clifford in The Hunchback on April 21 , 1862. He was a member of the Actors' Order of Friendship (AOOF); a benevolent association started in 1849 with chapters in Philadelphia and New York City.

Although he apparently was not involved personally with the group, Adams allowed use of his name for the 1865 creation of the Adams's Dramatic Association in Pittsburgh.

In 1867, Adams joined Edwin Booth's acting company, appearing in Romeo and Juliet, Narcisse, Othello, and Enoch Arden, becoming the creator of the Arden role. From 1870 to 1875, Adams toured the country performing his best-known roles. Parts with which he was closely identified included Edward Middleton in The Drunkard, Mercutio in Romeo and Juliet, Robert Landrey in The Dead Heart, and the title roles in Hamlet and Macbeth. He was also known for his recitation of the narrative poem Enoch Arden by Alfred, Lord Tennyson.

Adams toured to Australia in 1875 and became seriously ill while there. He never completely recovered from this illness and it ultimately led to the end of his career. After he returned to the United States, he was the recipient of a benefit at the California Theatre in San Francisco.His last appearance was at the California Theatre in San Francisco in 1876. He died in Philadelphia on October 28, 1877. He is buried in Mount Moriah Cemetery.
