= California Theatre (San Francisco) =

Theatre in San Francisco, California, US

Coordinates: 37°47′27.3″N 122°24′17.4″W

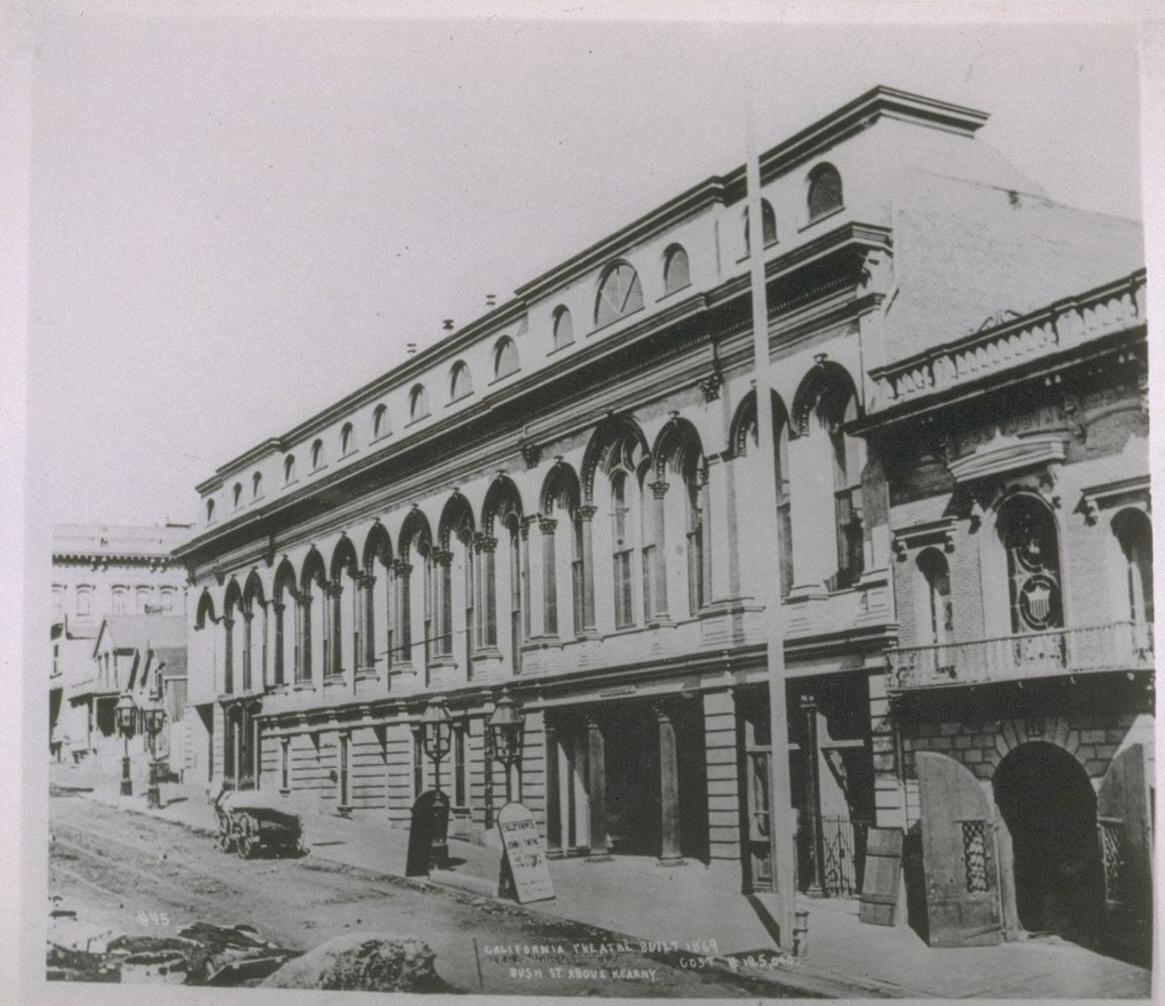
- California Theatre c. 1870
- Interactive map of California Theatre
- Address: 414 Bush St. San Francisco
- Owner: Bank of California
- Operator: William Ralston
- Designation: California Theatre

Construction
- Opened: January 18, 1869
- Demolished: 1906
- Rebuilt: May 18, 1889
- Architect: S. C. Bugbee & Son

California Historical Landmark
- Reference no.: 86

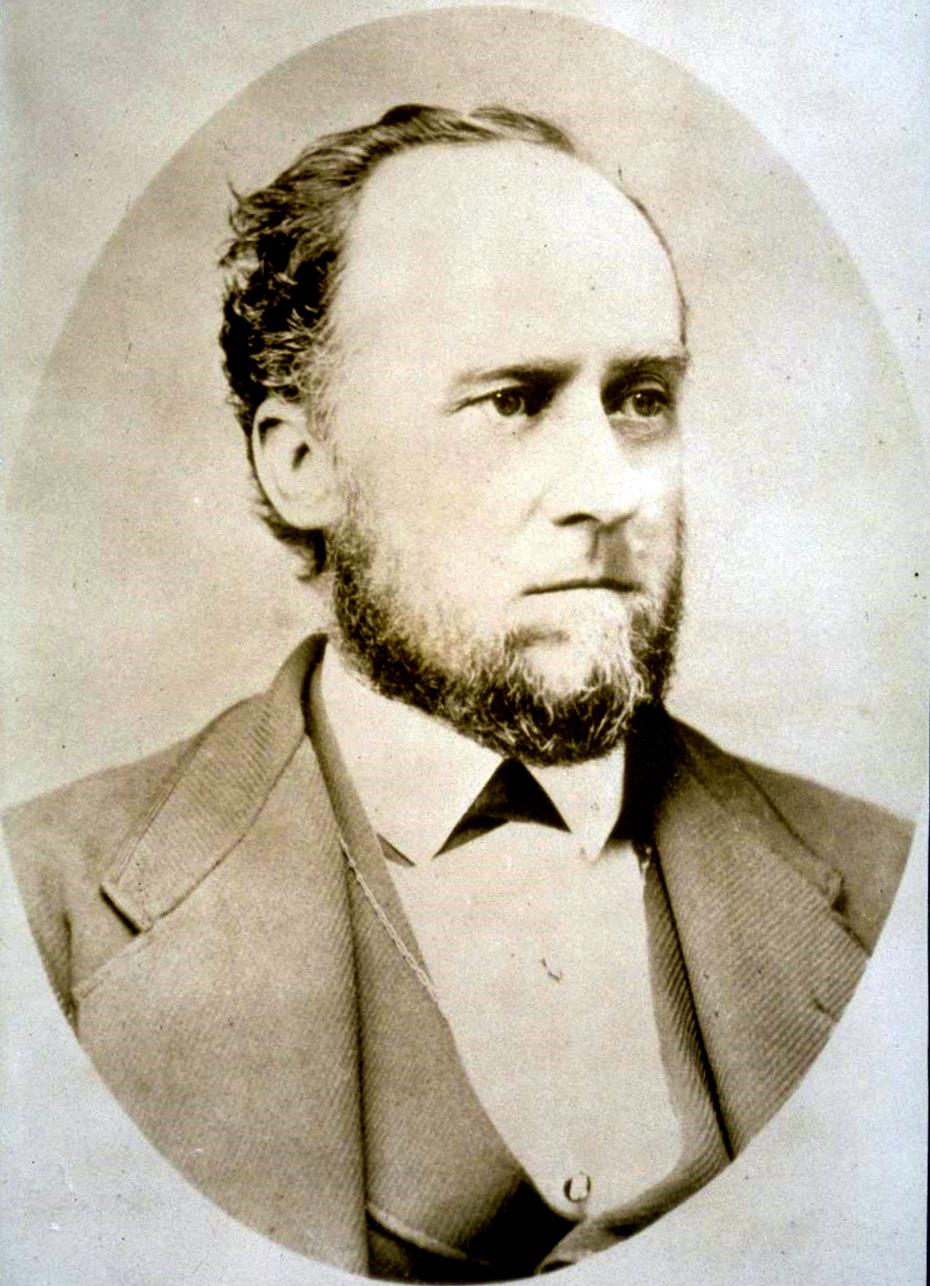
William Ralston

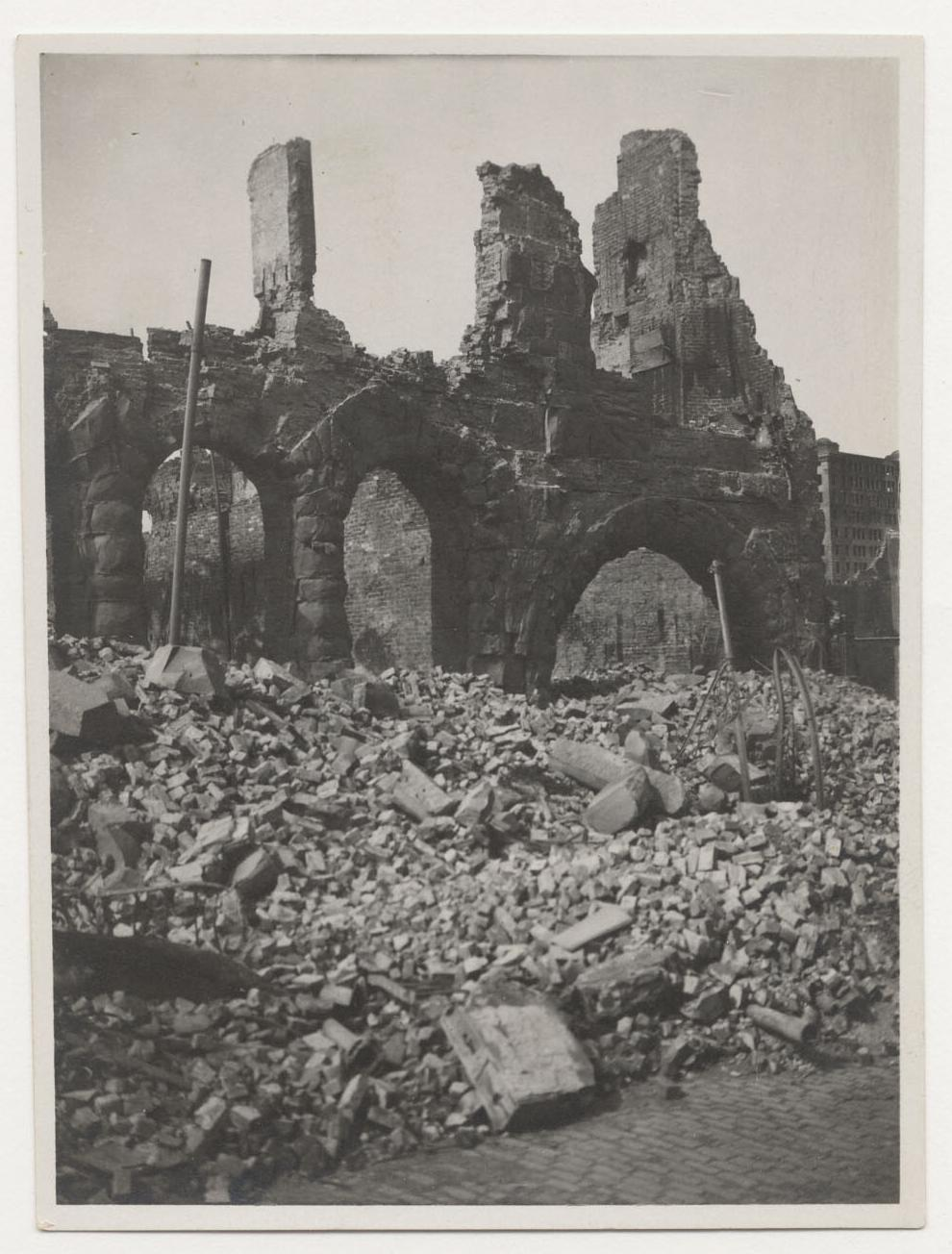
California Theatre ruins 1906

The California Theatre was located at 414 (now 440) Bush Street, San Francisco. It was built in 1869 by William Ralston, at that time the treasurer of the Bank of California. S. C. Bugbee & Son were the architects and the theatre cost $250,000 to build. (Note: Another source puts the figure at $150,000. (ref.The Oxford Companion to American theatre (2004)) The original theatre was demolished and rebuilt in 1889. It was destroyed in the San Francisco earthquake of 1906. The former site (north side of Bush Street, between Kearny and Grant) is now a California Historical Landmark, with a historical marker commemorating the theatre and its artists. The original theater encompassed 165 feet of frontage, 117 feet in depth, resting on 4 1/2 foot foundation walls; a handsome building with a dress circle, gallery and 51 foot ceiling space in the interior auditorium.

== History ==
Ralston, and his partner's decision to build the theater was inspired by the acting of John McCullough and Lawrence Barrett, who he felt deserved a theater of their own to showcase their talent. Their belief that it would prove a lucrative investment was proven right. The theatre was successful beyond wildest expectations. The Corinthian-style temple of amusement, which had cost a quarter of a million dollars, opened on January 18, 1869, with a performance of Bulwer-Lytton's play Money. it was the leading theater in the city until its demolition in 1888. There were elaborate murals of San Francisco painted by local artist G.J. Denny and a panoramic view of San Francisco Bay entitled "Entrance to the Golden Gate," on the drop curtain. The theater claimed to be the first on the West Coast to use calcium light (limelight) with parabolic reflectors, aimed from the house, to light up the stage.

On the first anniversary of the theater's opening, a Scandinavian bandleader had the following to say,

The first year [1869-1870] the California Theatre cleared $100,000. On the evening of our first anniversary, Mr. Barrett stood at the stage door and invited every single individual belonging to the theatre, saying that after the performance we should all meet up in Pacific Hall on the second floor of the California Theatre building, facing Bush street. Upon coming into the hall we were surprised with a large banquet table set in the form of “T” and furnished from the best caterer, Maison-Doree, at $5 a piece.

Buttressed by good financial prospects due to a mini-boom in mining in Nevada, the California Theater enjoyed a blockbuster premiere season. With Annette Ince as leading lady, and a fine supporting cast largely recruited from rival manager Thomas Maguire, the California hosted plays ranging from Shakespeare through melodrama and comedy. Comedian John E. Owens became the first nationally known star to perform at the California on tour, followed by East Coast sensation Charlotte Thompson. At the end of the first season, the large cast and crew of the California traveled to Virginia City, Nevada to perform for over a month at Piper's Opera House in popular shows including Sea of Ice. By January 3, 1870, the theater had offered its 300th performance with McCullough and Barrett in an intense rivalry highlighted by the fact that McCullough had appeared in twenty-seven leading roles to Barrett's ten. By mid-1870 Barrett took a leave of absence and returned to New York City, eventually selling his financial interest to John McCullough. Barrett returned to the California Theatre as a star, not a manager, in 1872 as part of a western tour.

The theater enjoyed exceptional years in the mid-1870s due to good economic times following the discovery of the discrete big bonanza ore chamber on the Comstock Lode. Coupled with recession on the East Coast, many recognized actors and actresses trekked west to play the California. The cavalcade of stars included Dion Boucicault in his own creations, Lotta Crabtree, William J. Florence, Elizabeth Crocker Bowers, Agnes Booth and her husband Junius Booth Jr., Edwin Booth, Katherine Rodgers Randolph and others. In spite of the theatre's success, the Bank of California, which owned the theatre, failed in 1875, as the National Panic of 1873 challenged the financial picture after the short-lived silver boom. Soon thereafter, Ralston went swimming and drowned, leading to speculation that he might have committed suicide. (Note: This is somewhat belied by the evidence that he was seen thrashing about in the water at the time of his drowning.) Although the theatre then went into a decline, it had broken manager Thomas Maguire's hegemony in the western theater world. Mrs. D. P. Elizabeth Crocker Bowers became the last legitimate star on tour of the California Theatre before its demise in 1888.

Although San Francisco did not host full operas during the mid-1800s, singers presented operatic music on occasion. The theatre hosted soprano Inez Fabbri on occasion, as well as Nellie Melba. (Note: Melba's performance was cut short by a fire in the neighboring building causing a stampede for the exit by San Francisco's Social Register who were there en masse and decked out for the occasion, leaving behind furs and other valuable belongings in the pandemonium, with an estimated value of $4000.)

=== The new California Theatre ===
A new California Theatre, opened on the site on May 18, 1889, but was destroyed in the 1906 earthquake and fire, but it never regained its former status after Ralston's death in 1875 and McCullough's departure in 1877. During the 1880s San Francisco hosted a change in theater business strategies from stock companies to the use of combination companies, in part, a response to poorer economic times with the demise of silver mining. The new California theatre was the first on the West Coast to be lighted exclusively with electricity.

The periodical, The Electrical World, had the following to say about the new theatre,

The new temple of Thespis is situated on the site of the famous old California Theatre. It is perfectly fire-proof, and has 19 exits. The main entrance, on Bush street, is formed by a Roman arch of massive proportions and striking design. The vestibule is rectangular in shape, is finished in antique oak panelling, with pilasters and arabesques, and is lighted by thirty-two 16 candle-power lamps and an electrolier of eight 82's. In the beautiful foyer is another large electrolier.

In the auditorium, behind the eight proscenium boxes, with dome-shaped canopies supported by columns, rise arches of Indian fretwork carrying pillars surmounted by 88 candle-power lamps enclosed in opalescent globes shaped like pineapples. The ceiling consists of three concave divisions extending from wall to wall parallel with the front of the stage, gradually rising upward, and separated by narrow panels or chords. It is crossed by four bands of dark color, in which, as well as in the chords and fantastic tracery of the decorations, are set numbers of lamps. From the ceiling, over the parquet and near the boxes, depend three rich electroliers similar in design to those throughout the house, formed by a centre fixture of opalescent glass held in cast metal work, with four pendants of the same shape hanging by chains attached to arms radiating from the stem of the fixture. All the electroliers were specially designed by J. M. Wood, of Chicago, the architect.

Throughout the house the decorations are so designed that lamps in the midst of bands of flowers, dados and carvings, not only afford light, but add hitherto unknown features to the general ornamentation. At the back of the metal and plastic tracery of the boxes, balcony and gallery, panels of cathedral glass are inserted, which soften the radiance of 16 candle-power lamps set behind, and give to the railings the effect of carvings thrown into relief by mellow light. For producing winter and moonlight effects, and as a substitute for calcium light, six movable bunch lights, with silvered reflectors, are provided.

The rheostats, which control all the lamps in the house, are of novel design. They are divided into six parts, which are in connection with six step-by-step switches, capable of being operated rapidly and positively. The handles of the switches can be locked to a shaft which runs through all; by tightening the handles of the switches to the shaft every part of the house can be dimmed at once, and by loosening any number, any portions can be regulated at the will of the switch-man. Being equally divided, one-half the lamps in the auditorium can gradually be turned down while the other half is being lighted, producing a fine blending effect. This is probably the only theatre in the country where the switches are so arranged.

=== Landmark ===
In 1933, the site was registered as California Historical Landmark #86. The landmark marker, located at 430 Bush Street, mentions the January 18, 1869 opening date, and lists a number of artists who played there.

== Notable artists ==
- Edwin Adams
- Lawrence Barrett
- Adele Blood
- Edwin Booth
- Hobart Bosworth
- Lotta Crabtree
- Willie Edouin
- Harry Edwards
- Inez Fabbri
- John McCullough
- Nellie Melba
- Helena Modjeska
- Adelaide Neilson
- John T. Raymond
- Minnie Walton
