= Minnie Walton =

Australian-American singer and actress

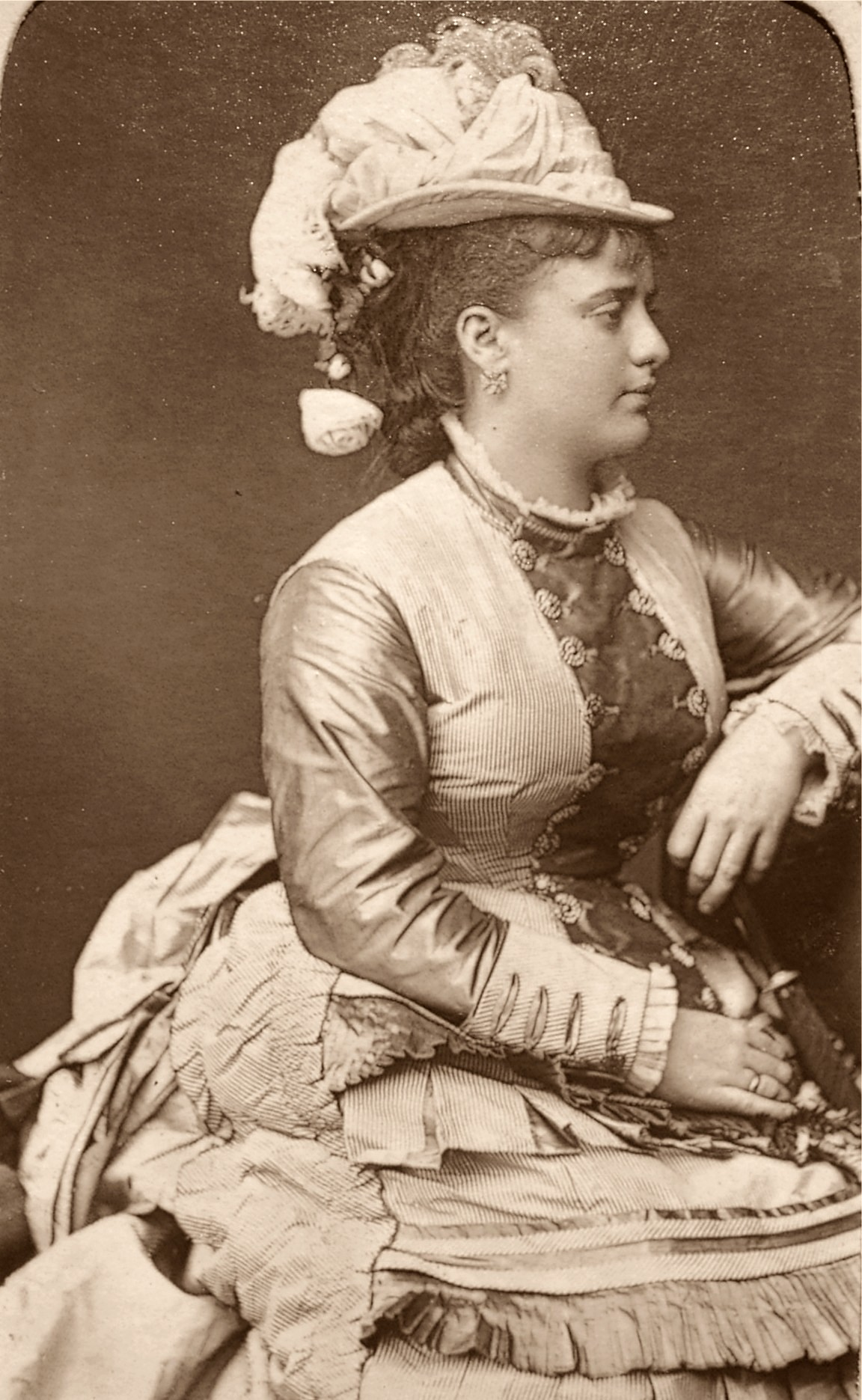
- Born: 1852; Sydney, Colony of New South Wales
- Died: 1 July 1879 (aged 26–27); San Francisco, USA
- Occupations: singer, actress
- Years active: 1867-1879

Minnie Walton (1852 – 1 July 1879) was an Australian-American singer and actress. She began her career in Australia in 1867, moving to California in 1868, where she played the title role in The Colleen Bawn, among others. She performed in the United States until 1874, when she appeared for a season in England playing Mary in Our American Cousin, among other roles. She then made appearances in Australia before returning to California, where she died in 1879.

== Life and career ==
Walton was born in 1852 in Sydney, Australia.

She began her career as a singer, performing with William Saurin Lyster's company in Australia in 1867. In 1868, she married Lyster's brother, Fred Lyster, who was in the management of the English Opera Company.

The same year she traveled to the US with the company and made her debut as an actress at Maguire's Opera House in San Francisco as the title character, Eily O'Connor, in Dion Boucicault's The Colleen Bawn. She remained with that company until the California Theatre opened on 18 January 1869, when she was engaged there, where she remained until late 1870.

On 14 November 1870, Walton performed in New York, for the first time, at Wood's Museum, with the Lydia Thompson troupe, playing Venus in Paris or the Apple of Discord. After several weeks, Walton returned to San Francisco and rejoined the California Theatre company, remaining with them until late in 1873. She then appeared in New York at The Broadway Theatre, playing Violet in About Town and co-starred in Fritz.

In 1873, Walton played Rose in A Flash of Lightning at the Grand Opera House in San Francisco. She also appeared at the Grand Opera House in the comedy of Three Millions of Money and The Regiment of Champagne, where some of her performances were warmly received, while others were criticized as lacking in force. After this, Walton toured the United States with E. A. Sothern.

In 1874, Walton made her first appearance in England at the Haymarket Theatre with Sothern as Mary Meredith in Our American Cousin. After a season in England, she traveled to Australia and performed there with Sothern's son Lytton for some time, and then again returned to San Francisco.

Minnie Walton died of apoplexy on 1 July 1879 at her home in San Francisco, at the age of 27.
