= Fremdsprachen und Hochschule =

- Discipline: Language education
- Language: English

Publication details
- History: 1968–present
- Publisher: German Association of University Language Centers
- Frequency: Triannual

Standard abbreviations
- ISO 4: Fremdspr. Hochsch.

Links
- Journal homepage

Fremdsprachen und Hochschule (Foreign Languages and University) is a triannual academic journal published by the German Association of University Language Centers.

== History ==
The journal was created in 1968 under the title AKS-Rundbrief (= AKS-Circular) by the German Association of University Language Centers. Being a practice-oriented journal in the first phase of its existence, it has developed into an academic, at times empirical, journal throughout the years.

== Content and scope ==
Fremdsprachen und Hochschule covers second language acquisition, language education, and applied linguistics, with English, French, Spanish, Italian, and German as foreign languages being the potential target languages. Intercultural analyses represent an important part as well. Publication languages are German as well as any of the languages mentioned above.

== Publication and editors ==
Fremdsprachen und Hochschule is published triannually by the German Association of Language Centers, which is a sub-organization of the European Association of Language Centers. There are three editors, with manuscripts requiring two positive votes.

== Article types ==
In addition to academic articles, book reviews on relevant publications, including newly published textbooks, are also included. In addition, the journal publishes calls for papers and academic conference announcements. The journal also serves as an information and publication platform for UNIcert - the international education and certification system for foreign languages taught at universities, which was founded in Germany and whose headquarters are located there.
