= Ema Pukšec =

Austrian opera singer

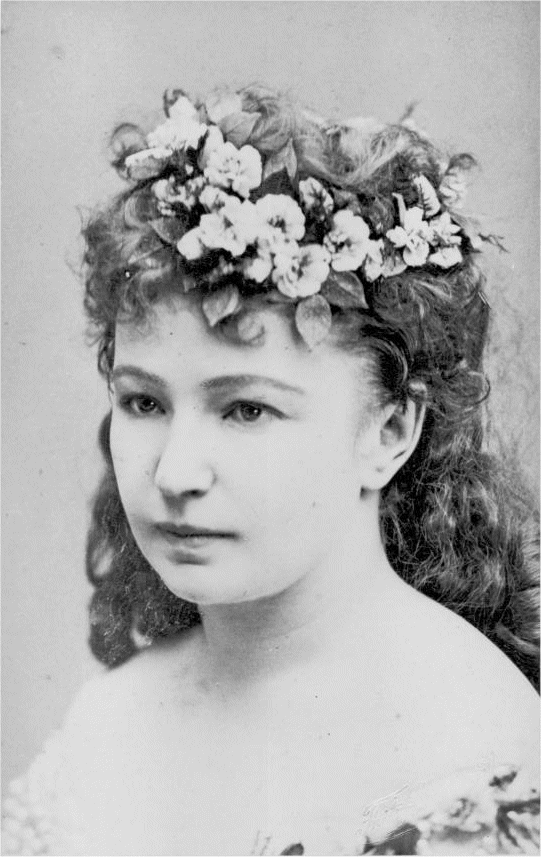
Ilma de Murska

Ema Pukšec (February 6, 1834 – January 14, 1889), also known as Ilma de Murska, as well as Ilma di Murska, was a 19th-century operatic coloratura soprano with a voice with nearly three octaves compass from Croatia.

== Life ==
Ema Pukšec was born in Ogulin (present-day Republic of Croatia). Her mother was Krescencia Brodarotti de Trauenfeld, while her father, Josip Pukšec, was a highly respected military officer stationed in the region around the city of Slunj. For his service in protecting the eastern flanks of western Europe within the Austrian Military Frontier, her father was granted nobility and added the extension Murski to his name. The feminine variant (de Murska) was later used by Ema as her own surname.

She began playing the piano at the age of five. After her family moved to Zagreb in 1850, she started to sing, hoping for a later opera career. She married a soldier by the name of Josip Eder in 1851, with whom they had two children (Alfons and Hermina). They moved first to Graz in 1857, then to Vienna in 1860, in order to enable Ema to study voice in the city's conservatory. She also studied for a time in Paris. Her professional career started in 1862 and lasted some 20 years.

== Career ==
Ilma de Murska was a coloratura soprano with a range of three octaves. Her career as Ilma de Murska started in 1862 in Florence, Italy as Lady Harriet in Friedrich von Flotow's Martha. Some sources claim she debuted as Marguerite de Valois in Les Huguenots. Her tour of Europe followed by performing in Budapest, Spain and Italy. After a string of 42 successful performances she went to Vienna as a guest artist and sang on August 16, 1864 in Verdi's Il Trovatore. Her period in Vienna closed on August 10, 1873 in a farewell performance, in which she played Ophelia in the very first performance of Ambroise Thomas' Hamlet at the Vienna Court Opera. Her most noted roles included the Queen of the Night in Mozart's The Magic Flute and Lucia di Lammermoor. She also sang the roles of Dinorah and Isabella in Robert le Diable.

=== London ===
Ilma de Murska's London appearances were from 1865 until after 1873 and were generally in connection with James Henry Mapleson's company. She made her London debut as Lucia di Lammermoor at Her Majesty's Theatre. Her appearance as Queen of the Night in 1865 was a great success. George Bernard Shaw observed that, in the famous fioriturae of this role, she sang "to chime with a delicate ring and inimitable precision of touch". In 1866 she sang Meyerbeer's Dinorah. That autumn she played Ophelia in Ambroise Thomas's Hamlet, with Charles Santley and Karl Formes, in London and on tour.

In 1871 she was Isabella for Ernesto Nicolini's English debut, in Robert le Diable. She also took part in Mapleson's tours in Dublin between 1872 and 1876.

After leaving Vienna in 1873, de Murska performed in Hamburg, Berlin and Paris. In 1873-74, she toured United States. She also toured Russia, Australia and New Zealand, and for a period of time she lectured at the music conservatory in New York City. In June 1875 she left for her Australasian tour, at which she gave 145 concerts, ten operas and two oratorios, clearing for herself £16,000, according to one account, of which she sent £11,000 to her daughter in Austria. She married, almost certainly bigamously, the pianist Alfred Anderson in Sydney on 29 December 1875 during her Australian tour. She was obliged to break her schedule a few weeks later in Melbourne, as her husband was gravely ill. As a result, her fans in that city were treated to additional performances, in Lucia di Lammermoor and La Sonnambula, alternating nights with Fannie Simonsen. Anderson, who had been suffering intermittently before the marriage, died on 22 March. Within two months, on 15 May 1876, while on tour in Dunedin, New Zealand, De Murska had married again, to John Hill, a friend and colleague of Anderson. This marriage lasted no longer than any of her others, as when de Murska returned to America in October 1876, Hill remained in Australia.

De Murska was noted for her hypersensitivity, especially about her age, and for the large menagerie of animals which accompanied her everywhere. Most important of these was an immense black Newfoundland dog called Pluto, which was trained to eat fowl off a plate, set for him as a place at the dining table with his mistress, without dripping anything on the tablecloth. He customarily travelled in a first-class carriage. His constant travelling-associates were two parrots, an Angora cat, and a monkey. The monkey and cat tormented each other and clawed each other's fur, and the parrots were given free range in the hotels where the diva was staying, and were frequently destructive of the furnishings. De Murska accepted the consequent expenses happily.

== Assessments ==
Music critics, aristocratic opera patrons and ordinary listeners alike called her "The Croatian Nightingale" following her acclaimed appearances in Vienna and London. She was known to deviate from the score and improvise. The conductor would hold back the orchestra's crescendo until she was ready. This impromptu approach was what endeared her to the audience.

== Death ==
Ema Pukšec (aka Ilma de Murska) died in Munich on January 14, 1889, aged 54.
