= Inez Viegas =

Brazilian actress

Inez Viegas (born December 13, 1970) is a Brazilian actress.

== Biography and career ==
Inez entered theater at the age of twelve. She trained in Brazil and New York. She was a member of the theater group Tá na Rua, which she remained a part of for two years. She began her career in television at the age of 32, making an entry by participating in the telenovela Chocolate com Pimenta (Chocolate with Pepper), by Walcyr Carrasco. She had roles such as Marly in Como uma Onda (Like a Wave) and Nara Leão in Por Toda a Minha Vida (For All Of My Life), which told the story of the singer. Her most recent television appearance was on the show Natalia, on TV Brazil and her last telenovela was Promessas de Amor (The Promises of Love), aired by Rede Record. In the world of film the actress starred in a few short films and made an appearance in Bruna Surfistinha.

== Career ==
=== On TV ===
- 2011 - Natália - Fotógrafa
- 2009 - Promessas de Amor - Valéria
- 2008 - Capitu - Irlá
- 2007 - Eterna Magia - Jandira
- 2007 – Por toda minha vida – Nara leão
- 2005 - América – Josinéia
- 2004 - Como uma onda - Marly
- 2003 - Chocolate com Pimenta - Ernesta

=== In theater ===
- O Diário de Anne Frank
- Vontade de Nada
- A Semente não Mente
- Cama Mesa e Banho
- Tá na Rua
