= Inez Magnusson =

Swedish criminal (1897–1953)

Inez Magnusson (née Nicolina Theresia Johannesdotter; 26 February 1897–13 September 1953), also known as Inez Johansson, was a Swedish fraudster.

She was convicted on 22 October 1941 of fifteen cases of fraud. Magnusson is estimated to have defrauded her victims of three million kronor (the equivalent of sixty million US dollars in 2005). The trial lasted for nine months and became a cause celebre in the press; Magnusson was referred to as Vampyren ("the vampire") and Iskalla Inez ("Ice Cold Inez"). She was sentenced to 15 years of forced labor and fined 75, 000 kronor in damages. She has been referred to as the "most successful woman fraudster in Swedish history."

== Life ==
Inez Magnusson was born as Nicolina Theresia Johannesdotter to the poor farmer Johannes Olsen Gudding in the parish of Ås outside the city of Östersund, in the centre of Sweden. In 1918, she moved to Stockholm to work as a maidservant. She took the name Inez Johansson. She had a son in 1920 and a second son in 1921 and was given an allowance for her sons by their fathers.

=== Blackmail ===
She left her employment and became a sex worker, working from the boarding house of Hanna Hedman. Inez Johansson became active in blackmail in cooperation with Hedman. The process of blackmail had a common pattern. After a sexual encounter with a rich man, she would inform him that she had become pregnant and ask him for money for an abortion, which was illegal at the time. Having received the money, she would ask the man for further money to take care of the injuries she had received during the abortion and to pay for the silence of people who had found out about the illegal abortion. In parallel, Hanna Hedman would photograph the sexual activities and then threaten the man with publishing the photograph unless he paid her. Their blackmail operation was very lucrative for a number of years. Among her clients were reportedly Ivar Kreuger.

Her companionship with Hedman ended when Hedman began a lesbian love affair with the journalist Thyra Peterson. Peterson was herself an active blackmailer, and when informed about the Johansson-Hedman operations, she started to blackmail Johansson herself.

=== Fraud ===
In 1929, Inez Johansson married Charles Magnusson, who was able to buy the Eden Hotel AB in Stockholm and begin a successful career as a hotel owner (the couple did not live together and divorced in 1939). She thus became known as Inez Magnusson. In 1936, Inez Magnusson managed to acquire the Ima AB business company. She used the company to defraud a number of clients through investment fraud. She performed several successful and lucrative investments in the following years.

During her career as an investment fraudster, she made attempts to defraud both the state of Nazi Germany as well as its Jewish victims. She unsuccessfully attempted to defraud Nazi Germany on a purported contract for them to buy Swedish iron ore, which was highly sought after by the German regime. In parallel, she also attempted to defraud German Jews wishing to escape Nazi Germany by offering to sell them false Swedish passports; this operation also failed, however.

=== Trial ===
In 1940, she was finally reported for investment fraud and arrested. The trial was intensely covered by the press and became a scandal that attracted much attention . Referring to the many rich people that had been blackmailed by Magnusson, the press reported that "half the noble calender is passing by," and Inez was called "The Vampire."

Most of the names of her upper-class victims were, however, kept out of the press. During the trial, she was claimed to be suffering from "moral insanity."

She was sentenced to 15 years of forced labor and fined thousands of kronor. She served only six years before she was released in 1947. She died of cancer in 1953.
