= Inez Fabbri =

American opera singer (1831–1909)

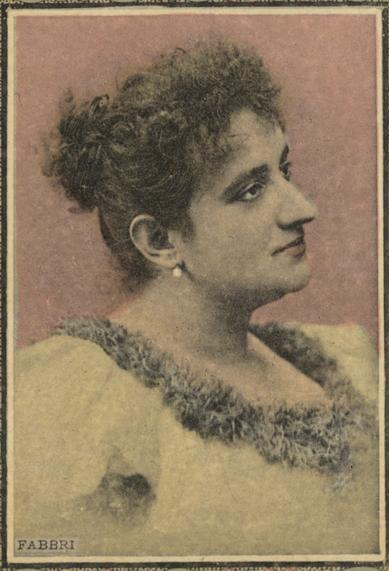
- Inez Fabbri ca. 1870
- Born: 26 January 1831; Vienna, Austrian Empire
- Died: 30 August 1909 (aged 78); San Francisco, California, U.S.
- Other names: Agnes Schmidt, Inez Fabbri-Mulder, Inez Fabbri-Müller
- Occupation: Opera singer (soprano)

Inez Fabbri (26 January 1831 – 30 August 1909), née Agnes Schmidt, was an Austrian American soprano, voice teacher and impresaria. She sang in Austria, Germany, England, South America and the Caribbean, making her home in San Francisco where, in the 1870s, she was the most important musical personality and prima donna assoluta of her time, performing in more than 150 concerts and operas from 1872 to 1879, producing operas, and teaching voice to up-and-coming singers.

== Early career ==
She was the daughter of an impoverished Viennese textile manufacturer. She made a successful operatic debut in Kassa, Hungary, (now Košice, Slovakia) in Donizetti's Lucrezia Borgia in 1847. After a few years on the road singing in Königsberg (1856–1857) and Potsdam (1857), she arrived at the Hamburgischerer Stadttheater where, among other roles, she received recognition for Valentine in Meyerbeer's Les Huguenots which became one of her starring roles.

Here she met Richard Mulder (1822–1874), a Dutch musician and impresario whom she married in 1858. He organized a tour to South America (1858–59) during which time she sang in Argentina, Brazil and Chile. (Note: "A fine opera company for the splendid new house at Santiago had arrived in Valparaiso in a French clipper. It possesses three prima donnas, Mesdames Fabbri, Wideman and Leoni Bardoni. Among the male singers are the tenor Benedetti, the bass, Domenech, and the baritone, Francolini. The company is headed by Mr. Mulder, and will open in Nabucodonosor", NYT (28 June 1858)) From then on she would use her stage name, "Fabbri" (Italian for "Schmidt/Smith").

== American career ==
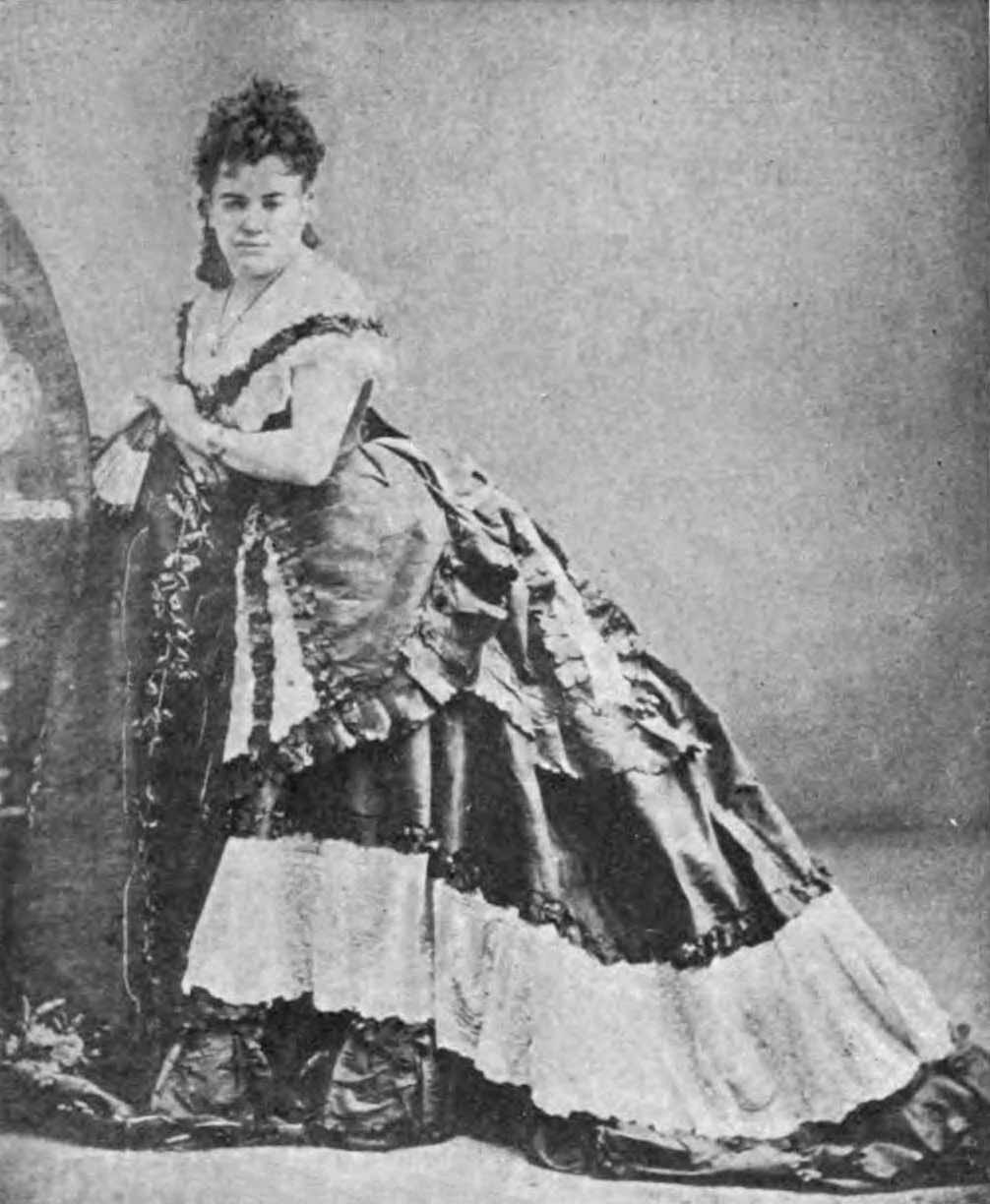
Inez Fabbri

In 1860, she was engaged by Max Maretzek to sing at his Winter Garden Theatre in New York. (Note: "Mr.MAX MARETZEK is expected to return to the City during the coming week; his season in Havana having terminated on the 26th of last month. The greatest anxiety prevails in musical circles concerning the new prima donna, Madame INEZ FABBRI, who is known to be great not only as a singer but as a lyric actress. Her admirers maintain that she is a new Jenny Lind, and the publics of Brazil, Peru and other South American States, even go further than that. In Rio Janteiro she was, preferred to LA GRANGE and LA GRUA, -- about whom there can be no mistake. On the 9th of April Mr. MARETZEK will commence operations, and then we shall both see and hear for ourselves. In the meantime we may satisfy public curiosity by stating that there is not the slightest doubt about Madame FABBRI being entitled to the place of honor among all the prime donne now in this country." NYT (5 March 1860)) Her highly acclaimed American debut was as Violetta in Verdi's La Traviata. (Note: "Madame FABBRI is the best Violetta we have had in this City. We say this without the slightest idea of underrating the excellencies of her predecessors. LA GRANGE was finished but cold; GAZZANIGA passionate but inartistic, and soon. Each singer illuminated a page of the story by some special flash of genius. Madame FABBRI lightens up the whole. In the first act she sings with the "joyaunce of rude strength; "in the second with, the broken accents of a sudden and stupifying calamity; in the third with the protesting vehemence of one wronged; in the fourth with the sunken tones of wretched because retrospective despair. Her perception of the emotional phases of the part are so varied and distinct, that a person seeing her in the first act, where she is all hilarity and voice, can form no idea of what she is in the last, where by consummate management she presents the spectra! and vocal wreck of her former self. The mezzo-voce by which this is effected is the best that we have heard in a singer of such prodigious power, and the acting with which it is accompanied, has not been surpassed in propriety, if it has even been exceeded in intensity." NYT (13 April 1860)) Shortly thereafter, she sang Elvira in Ernani in which The New York Times wrote that "she was more dramatic and powerful" [than in her role as Violetta] and "a dramatic actress of the first class". "Mme. Fabbri was called out twice after each act, and the finale to the third act was encored." (Note: The newspaper also reported a near disaster when her dress caught on fire from the footlights. The baritone was able to extinguish the fire by folding the dress over the flames. "As it is, the lesson will not, we trust be thrown away on the proprietors of the Winter Garden. No footlight should be allowed to exist without a wire guard. Madame Fabbri's courage in an emergency which would have taxed the nerves of the strongest man, was extraordinary. She did not even break the continuity of the note she was singing, until compelled to do so by a torrent of applause." NYT (17 April 1860))

Her debut at the Winter Garden was followed by tours in the American Mid-West, Canada and the Caribbean Islands. She was especially well received in Puerto Rico but lost all her possessions in a fire. In 1862–1863, she and her husband returned to Europe on a tour. From May 1863 to March 1864, she sang thirty-seven performances at the Wiener Hofoper in roles which included Elvira and Leonore in Verdi's Ernani and Il Trovatore, Raquel in Halévy's La Juive, and Alice and Berthe in Meyerbeer's Robert le diable and Le Prophète.

From 1864 to 1871 they lived in Frankfurt am Main where Fabbri was engaged to sing at the Stadttheater in roles which included Elisabeth in Wagner's Tannhäuser. She was described by critics at this time as a soprano with a strong, clear voice suitable for both coloratura and dramatic roles. After a guest performance at the Royal Opera, Covent Garden, she returned to New York in 1872 for an engagement with the Habelmann-Formes opera company.

=== San Francisco ===
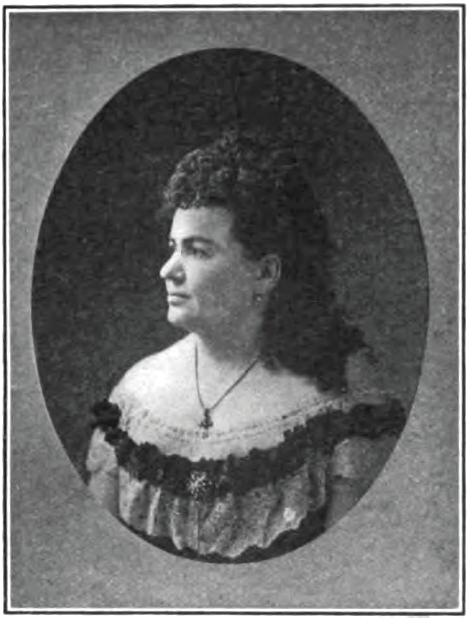
Inez Fabbri in San Francisco in 1872

In 1872, she went to San Francisco with the company where she sang at the California Theatre. She and her husband settled there and from 1873 to 1874 they produced forty-three operas, staging the first production of Die Zauberflöte in the city. Her husband founded a music school in San Francisco which she took over on his death in 1874. She continued to give concerts and to produce operas, many of which she performed in herself. From 1875 to 1876 she directed and sang in sixty operas. Her repertoire included some forty-six different roles.

On 17 January 1876, she inaugurated the new opera house, later renamed the Grand Opera House, in Snow Flake! And The Seven Pigmies.

== Later years ==
In 1878, she married, secondly, the baritone Jacob Müller (or Muller), a former student of her late husband. In 1881, she ended her singing career but continued her activities as an impresaria. After large financial losses she lived in Los Angeles from 1891 but later returned to San Francisco where she again lost her assets in a fire believed to be arson. In 1901, her second husband died. In 1905 she produced an opera for the last time.

== Death ==
She died in San Francisco, California in 1909, aged 78. Her archives are housed at the University of California, Berkeley. and her definitive original portrait is housed at the San Francisco Museum of Performing Arts and Design as donated by the Constance Jacoby Horstman and Janet Richmond Families.
