= Richard Lerman =

American composer

Richard Lerman (born Dec 5 1944 in San Francisco, CA; died June 20 2025) was a composer and sound artist whose, "work...centers around his custom-made contact microphones of unusually small size," including, "piezo disks and other transducers". Sound Generantion named him "the internet father of the piezo disk" in 2013. He studied with Alvin Lucier, Gordon Mumma, and David Tudor.

Richard Lerman is the populist of field recording technology. He makes inexpensive (under $1) microphones out of piezoelectric disks (small, flat pieces of metal), attaches them to blades of grass, and lets raindrops fall on them. Sometimes he lets hundreds of ants walk all over them in the desert. The sounds he produces are immediate, shocking, intensified, and brilliant. His work expands the infinitesimal sounds of the natural world into noises that are wide and surrounding, changing our human sense of scale.

— Rothenberg & Ulvaeus (2001),

Lerman received both his Bachelor of Fine Arts (Music, 1966) and Master of Fine Arts (Film and Theatre Arts, 1970) at Brandeis University. He was awarded a Guggenheim Fellowship in Sound Art (Video & Audio) for 1987-88. He also worked in film, having had a show at MOMA, and worked with advanced programming in DVD creation.

Lerman's work was often site-specific. Pieces include Travelon Gamelon, for amplified bicycles (1978), performed worldwide many times, most recently at the FKL Symposium in Cagliari, Sardiniam in Sept 2017 and for a retrospective of his work at Arizona State University; A Seasonal Mapping of the Sonoran Desert, which includes cactus needles plucked by rainfall; and Threading History, the collaboration with Mona Higuchi, for which he recorded prison camp barbed wire. In the 1980s he lived in Boston and taught at the Museum of Fine Arts School and at the Center for Advanced Visual Studies at MIT. He then taught sound and interdisciplinary arts at Arizona State University's West Campus Program in Interdisciplinary Arts and Performance beginning in 1994, becoming a Full Professor in 2001, and continued teaching there until his retirement.
