= Charm of Sound =

"Charm of Sound" is a 1997 text-based environmental composition in three parts, by Petri Kuljuntausta, which is composed for the environment of outer space. It invites the living creatures of Saturn's moon, Titan, to perform this work by using all the suitable material, solid and liquid, found on the ground of Titan.

Charm Of Sound association (Finnish: Äänen Lumo) is the name of a Finnish association for Electronic Music and Sound Art, founded by Petri Kuljuntausta in 1995.

== Background ==
In 1997, the Cassini–Huygens spacecraft (Titan-IVB/Centaur) was launched from Kennedy Space Center, United States, and reached its destination, Saturn's moon Titan, on 14 January 2005. Inside the Huygens probe, stored on the CD-ROM, was Kuljuntausta's "Charm of Sound".

Petri Kuljuntausta has stated: "If we suppose that there is somebody in outer space who could find the Huygens probe and understand how the CD-ROM works, signs of English language and meaning of artwork, then the composition is possible to realise with very basic elements, liquid and solid materials (objects), which might be available on Titan's ground".
