= Lucy Chambers =

Australian contralto (1834–1894)

Lucy Chambers (3 July 1834 – 14 June 1894) was an Australian contralto, one of the first to achieve any kind of success in Europe, where she was dubbed "the Australian nightingale". (Note: Others given that epithet more than once include Nellie Melba, Helene Esserman, Rene Maxwell, Florence Austral, Alice Hollander, Greta Callow, Alice Rees, Amy Sherwin, Millie Hanse, Cora O'Farrell, Emma Howson, Olivia Gains, . .) She became a successful teacher of singing, dubbed by one critic "the Marchesi of the Antipodes".

== History ==
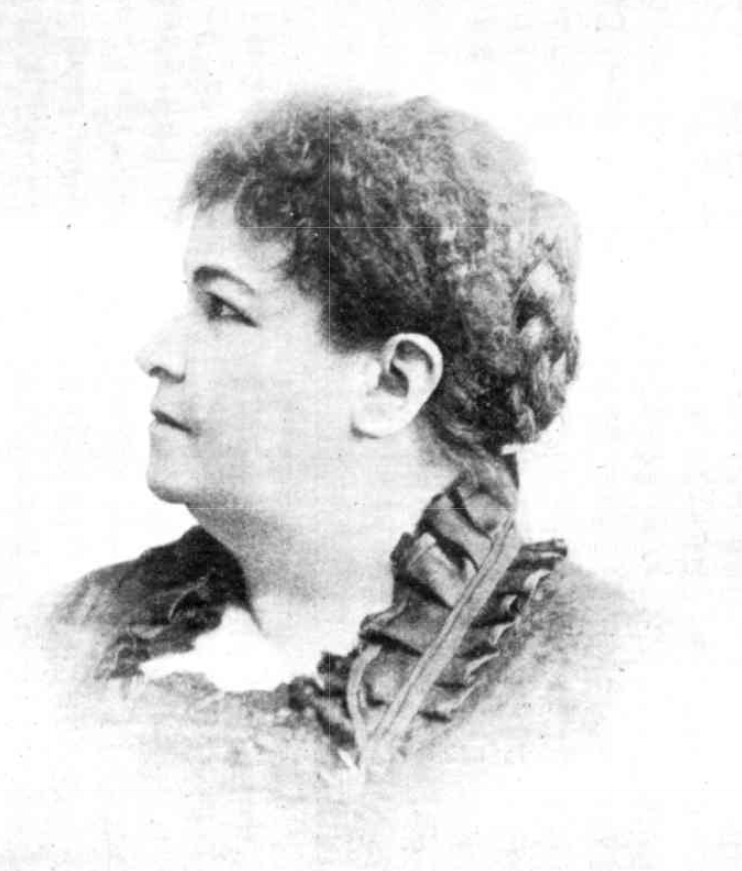
Lucy Chambers

Chambers was born in Sydney, youngest daughter of Lucinda "Lucy" Chambers (c. 1796 – 7 March 1854) and Charles Henry Chambers, (c. 1796 – 1 April 1854), a solicitor and onetime associate of William Charles Wentworth and first town clerk of Sydney. She had a good musical education, first studying pianoforte to an advanced level before taking singing lessons under Mrs Maria Logan, organist at St Andrew's, a past student of Logier and a cousin of William Vincent Wallace. (Note: No evidence has been found that Chambers had Isaac Nathan as a teacher.) She gained some local celebrity for the beauty of her voice, then came to the attention of Catherine Hayes, who toured Australia in 1854, and recommended she undertook further studies in London. In January 1862 she left for Europe, where she studied under the best masters — Manuel Garcia and Pietro Romani, Francesco Lamperti, Lauro Rossi, and Luigi Vannuccini. She made her debut in Italy at the Teatro Paglioni, later as principal contralto at La Scala, La Pergola, Il Regio and other European opera houses. She was engaged by the Australian entrepreneur William Saurin Lyster for his (second) Italian Opera Company. With her assistance, Lyster secured soprano Lucia Baratti and signors Neri, Dondi, and Contini (tenor, bass and baritone respectively). Chambers made her Australian debut with Lyster's company as Mafeo Orsini in Lucrezia Borgia at Melbourne's Theatre Royal in February 1870.

She remained with the company for three years, then took up teaching, with rooms at 6 Albert Street, Melbourne. Successful pupils include Amy Sherwin, Marie St Claire, Ada Gardiner (Ida Osborne), Alice Dunning Lingard, Fannie Liddiard, Bessie Pitta, Alice Rees (later Mme Vogrich), Colbourne Baber, Violet Varley, Edith Moore, Florence Young, Florence Esdaile, Cicely Staunton, Lucinda Blackham (sister of cricketer Jack Blackham), also tenor William Walshe.

She was the recipient of a well-subscribed benefit at the Melbourne Town Hall on 29 November 1884 and another, following losses due to the banking collapse, on 18 October 1893. This concert was well supported by an appreciative audience.

== Last days ==
Around Christmas 1893 she visited her sister, Mrs Gilmore, in Launceston, Tasmania, and while there contracted influenza, from which she never fully recovered, and died from a heart attack.

== Recognition ==
A song, "The Old Refrain" by Alfred Moul and E. Norman Gunnison, and published in 1880, was dedicated to Chambers.
