= Inez (singer) =

Danish singer

Inez (born as Tina Inez Gavilanes Granda, 15 October 1977 in Frederiksberg) is a Danish singer.

Her musical style can be described as dance music, with pop, club and Latin elements. She primarily sings in English, but often incorporates Spanish words and phrases in her songs.

In Scandinavia she is best known for her debut single "Stronger", which was played frequently in clubs across the Scandinavian countries throughout 2006. The single has subsequently been signed to Tommy Boy Records for a United States release. "Stronger" hit No. 7 on the Billboard Hot Dance Club Play in October 2007. "Stronger" and her following singles have all received airplay on Dutch radio stations as well as a number of radio stations across Europe.

Her fourth single, "Mi Aire", debuted at No. 34 on the Dutch Dance Chart on 4 May 2007, and peaked at No. 6.
