= Ines Reingold-Tali =

Estonian composer and musician

Ines Reingold-Tali (born 1970) also known as Inèz, is an Estonian new media artist, musician, composer and writer on sound art, noise, electronic music, glitch and digital culture.

== Early life and education ==
Reingold-Tali was born in Tartu in Estonia in 1970. She attended the Estonian Academy of Music and Theatre, and then studied in Finland at the University of Jyväskylä.

== Career ==
Reingold-Tali has been composing since the mid-1990s. She works in electroacoustic chamber music, and experimental music. She has composed commissioned work, and produced audio-visual art projects, drama and films. Intuition is important in her work.

She had visual art in the Florence Biennale of 2007 and the LACDA International Juried Competition Winners Show at the Los Angeles Center for Digital Art in 2007.

Reingold-Tali has written about composition, noise, glitch aesthetics, audiovisual art and digital art.

== Personal life ==
Reingold-Tali lives in Helsinki, Finland.

== Selected discography ==
=== Solo albums ===
- Inez: Déjà vu (CD YAP Records) 2015
- Ines Reingold-Tali: Oceano, computer animation art, (DVD, YOCOMA) 2008
- Ines Reingold-Tali: Suction, audiovisual art, (DVD, YOCOMA) 2007
- Ines Tali-Reingold: Meta-Rendez-vous (CD YAP Records) 2006
- Ines Reingold: Passione d´Amore (CD FG Music- Naxos) 1995

=== Compilations ===
- Energy of Visions 1999 (K-tel International)
- Sounds! 1999 (Charm of Sound)
- X-tato-holic, compilation album Energy Xtravadance 1998 (NRJ Radio & K-tel International).

== Selected works ==
- Audio-visual installation in Galerie Gora, Montréal QC Canada, 2009
- Audio-visual installation, "Suction", in the Lumiere Festival, III Rassegna Internazionale di Video Arte & Digital Cultures, international video art selection, Primo Piano LivinGallery, Lecce, Italy, 2008
- Audio-visual installation, "Suction", Primo Piano LivinGallery, Lecce, Italy, 2008

=== Commissioned works ===
- Audiovisual installation Oceano on FogScreen(2011) Science Center Ahhaa (Estonia)
- Video Art and Abstract Animations s.p.e.c.t.r.o-e.n.e.r.g.y (2008), FogScreen Collection (Finland)
- Q.res@Pirator (2000) thirtieth Festival International des Musiques Synthèse, Institut International de Musique Electroacoustique de Bourges (France)
- Energy of Visions (1999), compilation album, commissioned by K-tel International
- Meta-Rendez-vous (1999), composition for chamber orchestra, electronics, piano, bass singer, female and male voices, 17 min., commissioned by Finnish Broadcasting Company Yleisradio (Finland)
- Film score & music for the film A Sense of Loss (1997), directed by Timo Humaloja,
- Music installation Déjà vu (1997), in interaction with metal sculptures by Eero Hiironen, commissioned by SnowCastle of Kemi (Finland)
