= William Saurin Lyster =

Australian impresario (1828–1880)

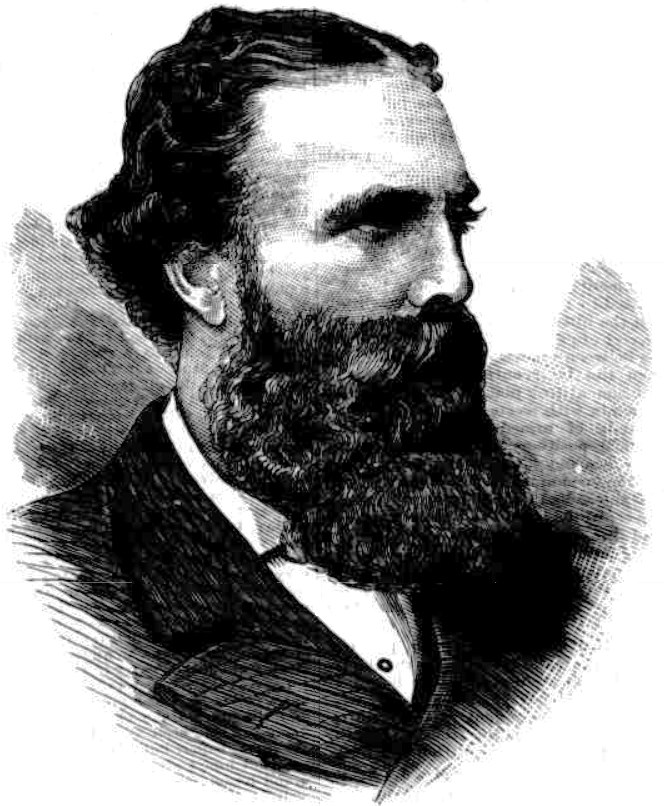
W. Saurin Lyster

William Saurin Lyster (21 March 1828 – 27 November 1880), often referred to as W. Saurin Lyster, was an Irish impresario, active in Australia.

== Early life ==
He was born in Dublin, the son of Chaworth Lyster, a former British Army officer, and was named after William Saurin. His mother was Anne Keightley, daughter of Thomas Keightley of Newtown, County Kildare and sister of Thomas Keightley the author.

Lyster went to sea, and visited Australia in 1842. He went to India. He served as a volunteer under Sir Harry Smith in the Seventh Xhosa War. In the mid-1850s he went to Nicaragua with the filibuster William Walker.

In the USA, Lyster became involved with the Lyster Opera Company, a "second-rate troupe" run by his brother Frederick whose wife Rosalie Durand was prima donna. After a season in San Francisco ending in December 1860, the company set sail for Australia.

== Impresario in Australia ==
The Lyster Opera Company headed by Lucy Escott and the tenor Henry Squires crossed to Australia on the SS Achilles. They toured for years, breaking new ground.

In eastern Australia of the 1860s Lyster had a large theatrical touring company. In common with George Coppin, he worked towards tours that could be intercolonial. At Sydney's Prince of Wales Opera House he took a lease and alternated opera and drama seasons.

== Interlude ==
In 1868 Lyster brought the Company, now including the Australian tenor Armes Beaumont, back to San Francisco. A short season at the Metropolitan Theatre there did not go well, and the Company broke up, with Frederick Lyster remaining at the Metropolitan as musical director. William travelled on to Europe to engage singers, finding the Australian contralto Lucy Chambers and others.

== Return to Australia ==
Back in Melbourne early in 1870, Lyster was reunited with Beaumont, and started a new season there with Ernani.

In the 1870s Lyster controlled the Prince of Wales Opera House, Melbourne, and also ran several touring opera companies. At the Opera House he built an elaborately-staged 1877 season around the drama Les Danischeff by Pierre Newsky and Alexandre Dumas fils, with the leading actor Edward Lytton Sothern, which he then took on tour; and he supported the London Comedy Company of Arthur Garner.

== Family ==
Lyster married Georgiana Rosa ("Georgia") Hodson (c. 1827 – September 1901) (Note: This reference includes at least one dubious statement: that her marriage in San Francisco to W. S. Lyster was in 1869, when several uncontested references in 1865 have them already married. It has her the daughter of Alfred Hodson, an Irish composer, where another reference has the daughter of George Hodson, an English composer.) Georgia was a sister of Fanny Musgrove and entertainer George Alfred Hodson (1822–1869), father of Henrietta Hodson Henrietta Ellen Hodson (1841–1910).

His brother Frederick Lyster, invariably referred to as Fred, was an operatic baritone, conductor and songwriter He married at least two times:

- Rosalie Durand (c. 1833 – 8 December 1866) before 1861
- Minnie Walton (c. 1852 – 1 August(?) 1879) in 1868.

== Legacy ==
The 1880s production era of Williamson, Garner, & Musgrove had been presaged, since Lyster, who died in 1880, had associated with both Garner and George Musgrove, who adapted his management approach.
