= Gunhild Bergh =

Swedish literary historian, writer, journalist

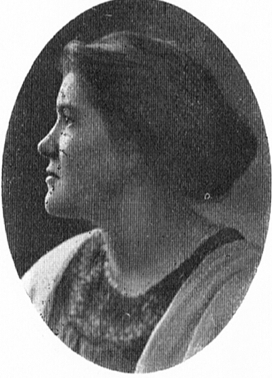
- Born: 20 December 1888; Gävle, Sweden
- Died: 10 September 1961 (aged 72); Rome, Italy
- Resting place: Campo Verano
- Education: Uppsala University
- Occupations: Writer, journalist
- Organization: Swedish Academy

Gunhild Bergh (20 December 1888 – 10 September 1961) was a Swedish literary historian, travel writer, and newspaper journalist. She was the second Swedish woman to be awarded a PhD in literary history. The Swedish Academy hired her during the 1950s to write reports on the two Italian Nobel Prize in Literature nominees, Alberto Moravia and Riccardo Bacchelli.

== Life ==
Gunhild Bergh was born on 20 December 1888, in Gävle. She was the daughter of the chief physician of the county hospital, Carl-Axel Bergh, and his wife Alfhild Bergh. She had four siblings, Gunnar, Ragnar, Einar and Karin. She went to the coeducational Whitlockska skolan in Stockholm, receiving her school leaving certificate in 1907. She was admitted to Uppsala University in the same year to study literary history and languages.

In 1911, she received her bachelor's degree and, in 1914, her licentiate in philosophy. On 26 May 1916 she defended her doctoral dissertation in literary history as the second Swedish woman to do so, on a thesis entitled "Litterär kritik i Sverige under 1600-1700-talen" (Literary criticism in Sweden during the 17th and 18th centuries).

Bergh then devoted herself to studies of Swedish naval officer, painter, author, and neo-classical architect, Carl August Ehrensvärd. In 1916 and 1917, she published several of his letters and stories in two volumes.

She then started travelling to Rome, and continued to, until she decided to stay and live there from 1920. Between 1922 and 1925, she published Ehrensvärd's collected writings in three volumes. In addition to literary works, she also used to do news reporting for newspapers and magazines.

Gunhild Bergh remained unmarried throughout her life. She died on 10 September 1961, in Rome. She was buried at the Verano cemetery.

== Publications ==
Bergh's publications included

- C. A. Ehrensvärds brev (ed. 1916–1917)
- Skrifter av Carl August Ehrensvärd (ed. 1922–1925)
- Till Palestina (1947)

== Bibliography ==
- Schwartz, Cecilia. "Gunhild Bergh". Svenskt kvinnobiografiskt lexikon. Translated by Grosjean, Alexia.
- Henrysson, Meg (1978). Gunhild Bergh och hennes efterlämnade brevsamling [Gunhild Bergh and her surviving collection of letters] (in Swedish). Borås.
- Krey-Lange, Elisabeth (1930). "Ett budskap från Italien. Dr Gunhild Bergh i Rom och hennes arbete" [A message from Italy. Dr Gunhild Bergh in Rome and her work.]. Idun (in Swedish). 43 (11): 283.

== See also ==
- Hilma Borelius, the first Swedish woman to be awarded a PhD, also in literary history.
