= Campo Verano =

Cemetery in Rome, Italy

Campo Verano Cimitero del Verano
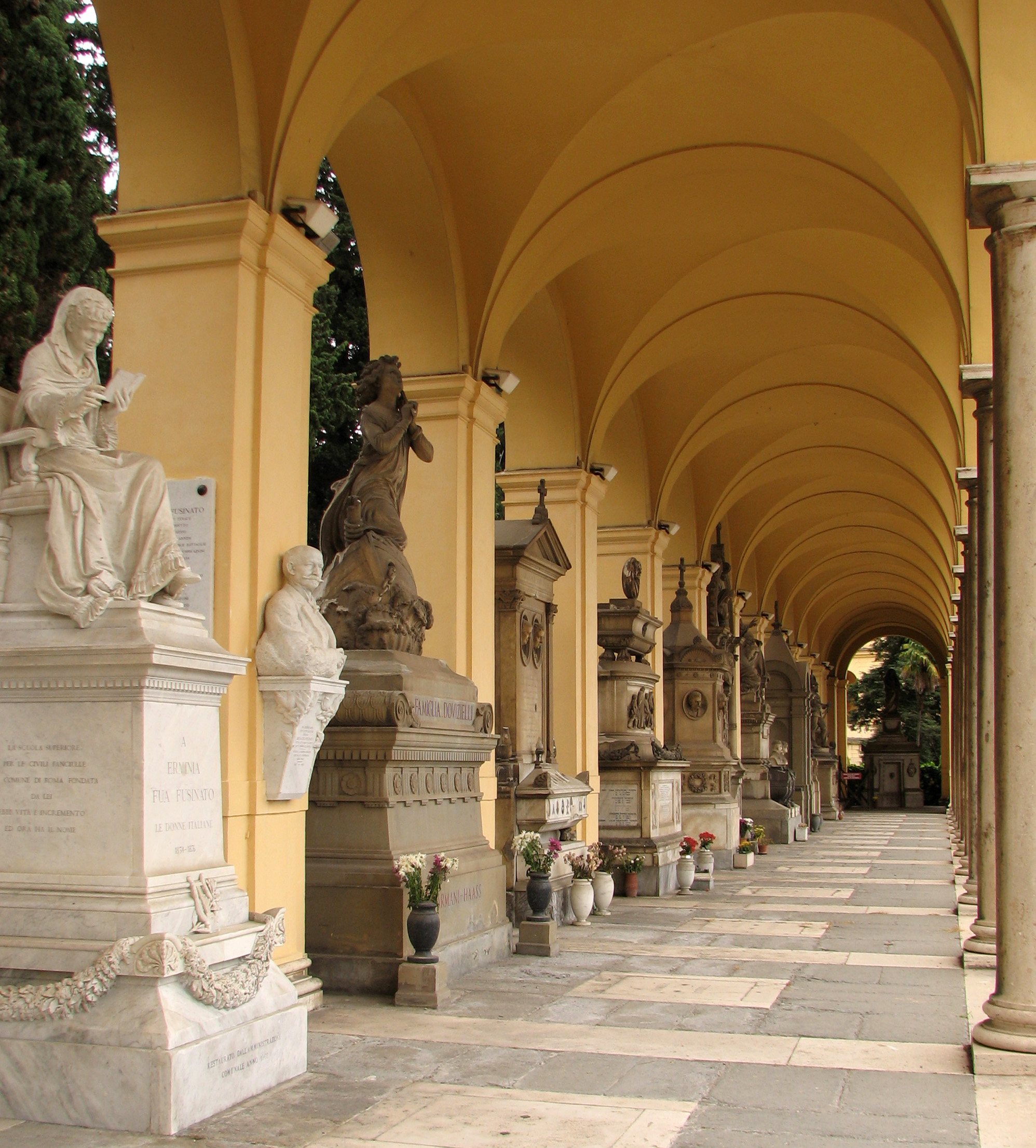
- Colonnade with funeral monuments at the Campo Verano.
- Interactive map of Campo Verano; Cimitero del Verano

Details
- Established: early 19th century
- Location: Rome
- Country: Italy
- Coordinates: 41°54′09″N 12°31′15″E
- Type: Public
- Size: 83 ha
- Website: Official website

The Campo Verano (Italian: Cimitero del Verano) is a cemetery in Rome, Italy, founded in the early 19th century. The monumental cemetery covers a surface area of 83 hectares which is currently divided into several sections: the main Catholic cemetery, the Jewish cemetery established in 1895, a Protestant section with its own entrance and a military section with monument to the victims of World War I.

== History and description ==
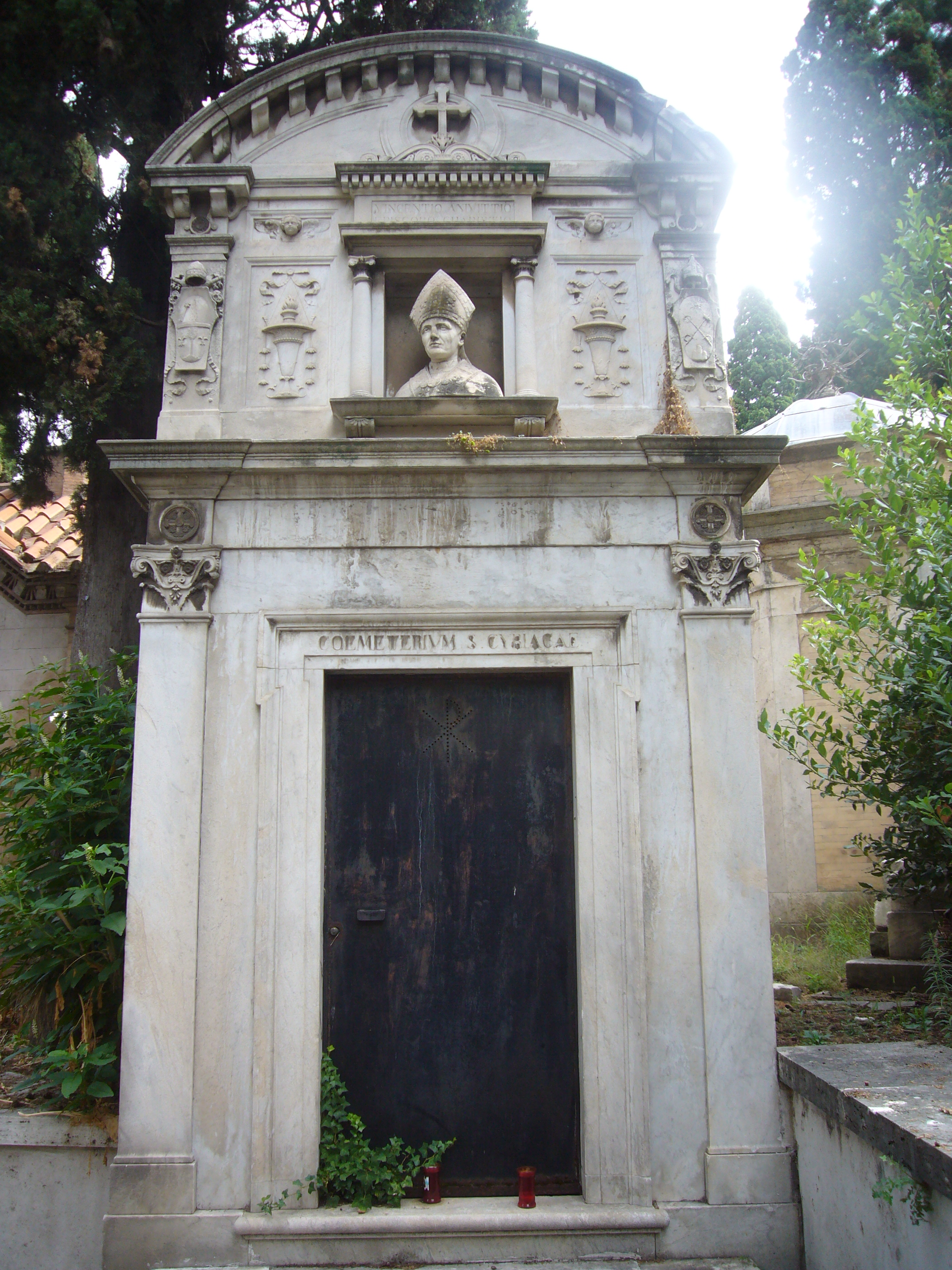
Entrance to the catacombs of St. Ciriaca through Verano cemetery with the inscription Coemeterium Cyriacae

The Verano (officially the "Communal Monumental Cemetery of Campo Verano") is located in the quartiere Tiburtino of Rome, near the Basilica di San Lorenzo fuori le mura. The name Verano refers to the ancient Roman Campo dei Verani that was located here. As evidenced by the existence of an earlier Roman necropolis dedicated to St. Ciriaca, the cemetery ground has been a burial place for at least twenty centuries. A modern cemetery was not established until the Napoleonic Kingdom of Italy during 1807–1812, when the architect Giuseppe Valadier was commissioned for designs after the Edict of Saint-Cloud required burials to take place outside of the city walls. Although the cemetery was consecrated in 1835, the works continued during the pontificates of Gregory XVI and Pius IX, under the direction of Virginio Vespignani who also built the cemetery church of Santa Maria della Misericordia (consecrated in 1860), along with the monumental entrance gate. The vast burial ground in an open-air museum setting is located on an undulating slope, dotted with majestic tombs in different styles, varying from Neoclassical architecture to Art Nouveau. Enamel funerary portraits of the deceased painted on lava by Filippo Severati are worth seeing. The papal authorities still have some control over the administration. Pope Francis celebrated All Saints Day Mass here on a papal visit to the cemetery on 1 November 2014.

== Notable burials ==
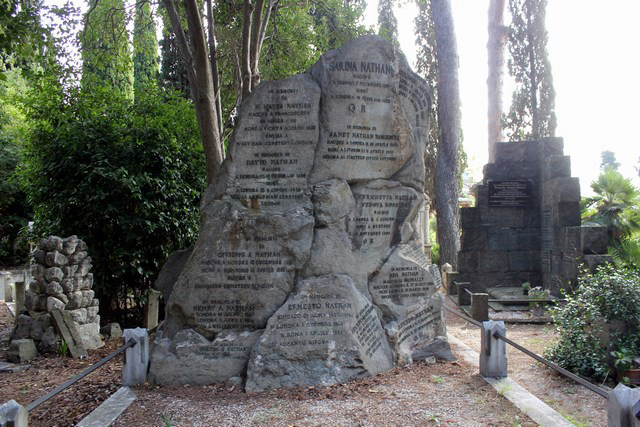
Memorial including Sarina Nathan (1845–1921), British Italian nationalist (and family)

Note that plots are not necessarily perpetual concessions, and if the grant is not renewed, graves are recycled and remains are moved to an ossuary or somewhere else.

=== 19th century ===
- Włodzimierz Czacki, (1834–1888), Cardinal, (1879–1882) Apostolic nuncio to France *Remains moved to Santa Pudenziana*
- Marià Fortuny (1838–1874), Catalan painter *Lot: Pincetto nuovo, riquadro 49*
- Stanisław Klicki (1775–1847), Polish military commander
- Giovanni Simeoni (1816-1892), Italian Cardinal, (1878–1892) prefect for Propagation of the Faith *Lot: Sacello di Propaganda Fide*
- Silvio Spaventa (1822–1893), patriot and politician *Lot: Quadriportico lato destro, arcata XXIII*

=== 20th century ===
- Pedro Arrupe, S.J. (1907–1991), Superior General of the Society of Jesus (1965–1983) *Remains moved to Church of the Gesù*
- Walter Audisio (1909-1973), politician, partisan, and executioner of Italian dictator Benito Mussolini and his mistress, Clara Petacci *Lot: Zona ampliamento, riquadro 142, cappella F, fila 3, loculo n. 7*
- Ennio Balbo (1922–1989), film actor *Lot: Zona ampliamento, gruppo 1 monumentale, cappella 34, piano uno, fila 1, loculo n. 2*
- Gunhild Bergh (1888–1961), Swedish writer, journalist, literary historian
- Alessandro Blasetti (1900–1987), film director *Lot: Vecchio reparto, riquadro 16, tomba n. 107*
- Mario Brega, (1923–1994), film actor *Lot: Nuovo reparto, gruppo 15, riquadro 58, fronte cappella Cantusci Paradisi*
- Bruno Corbucci (1931–1996), film director and screenwriter *Lot: Zona ampliamento, riquadro 133, tomba a terra n. 92*
- Sergio Corbucci (1926–1990), film director and screenwriter *Lot: Zona ampliamento, riquadro 133, tomba a terra n. 92*
- Elio de Angelis (1958–1986), F1 racing driver *Lot: Altopiano Pincetto, riquadro 38, tomba n. 10*
- Eduardo De Filippo (1900–1984), stage and film actor *Lot: Evangelici, riquadro 98, cappella 24*
- Peppino De Filippo (1903–1980), stage and film actor *Lot: Evangelici, riquadro 98, cappella 24*
- Fr. Joseph de Finance, S.J. (1904–2000), French Jesuit and eminent Thomist philosopher
- Vittorio De Sica (1901–1974), film actor, director and screenwriter *Lot: Zona ampliamento, riquadro 143, tomba a terra n. 61*
- Laura D'Oriano (1911–1943), Allied spy
- Gioacchino Ersoch (1815–1902), Italian architect active in Rome *Lot: Altopiano Pincetto, riquadro 38, tomba n. 10*
- Aldo Fabrizi (1905–1990), film actor *Lot: Zona ampliamento, riquadro 133, cappella 8*
- Ronald Firbank (1886–1926), English novelist *Lot: Tomba a terra, Ex Evangelici, riquadro 38*
- Mariano Fortuny y Madrazo (1871–1949), Spanish fashion designer, lighting engineer, and painter *Lot: Pincetto nuovo, riquadro 49*
- Rino Gaetano (1950–1981), singer and songwriter *Lot: Zona ampliamento, riquadro 119, cappella 5, piano terra, fila 2, loculo n. 10*
- Aleksander Gierymski (1850–1901), Polish painter
- Leone Ginzburg (1909–1944), writer and activist *Lot: Israelitico, fronte riquadro 10 bis, blocco 3, fila 3*
- Natalia Ginzburg (1916–1991), writer *Lot: Ex Civili, riquadro 20, tomba n. 5*
- Nilde Iotti (1920–1999), politician and partisan, President of the Italian Chamber of Deputies (1979–1992) *Lot: Famedio del PCI, nuovo reparto, riquadro 8 distinti (ingresso Portonaccio*
- Luciano Lama (1921–1996), politician and trade unionist *Lot: Famedio del PCI, nuovo reparto, riquadro 8 distinti*
- Franco Latini (1927–1991), actor and voice actor *Lot: Nuovo reparto, riquadro 60, piano terra superiore, passaggio C, gruppo 1, fila 1, loculo n. 1*
- Ugo La Malfa (1903–1979), politician and partisan *Lot: Arciconfraternita dei Trapassati, lotto 2, tomba 46*
- Tullio Levi-Civita (1873–1941), Italian mathematician, *Lot: zona "il Monte" (Altoripiano Vecchio Reparto), riquadro 23, tomba 40/97*
- Nanni Loy, (1925–1995), film director and screenwriter *Lot: Ex Civili, riquadro 18, tomba 7*
- Luigi Luzzatti (1841–1927), Prime minister of Italy between 1910 and 1911. *Lot: Vecchio reparto, riquadro 16*
- Errico Malatesta (1853–1932), Italian anarchist, theorist, and revolutionary socialist. *Lot: Vecchio reparto XIX, riquiadro 30, tomba 20*
- Marcello Mastroianni, OMRI (1924–1996), film actor *Lot: Zona ampliamento, gruppo 1º monumentale, tomba a terra n. 71*
- Charles Kenneth Scott Moncrieff (1889–1930), Scottish translator of the Marcel Proust novel Remembrance of Things Past
- Alberto Moravia (1907–1990), novelist and journalist *Lot: Altopiano vecchio, reparto Monte, riquadro 23, tomba n. 5*
- Alessandro Moreschi (1858–1922), last surviving castrato at the time of his death *Lot: Pincetto nuovo, riquadro 31 bis*
- Claudia Muzio (1889–1936), soprano *Lot: Vecchio reparto, riquadro 34*
- Ernesto Nathan (1845–1921), politician, Mayor of Rome (1907–1913) *Lot: Pincetto nuovo, riquadro 47*
- Pietro Nenni (1891–1980), politician and partisan *Lot: Pincetto vecchio, nuova scogliera, rango 2, fila 1, loculo n. 13*
- Francesco Saverio Nitti (1868–1953), politician, Prime Minister of Italy (1919–20) *Lot: Monte Portonaccio, 2^{0} gradone, numero 2, 97ª fila*
- Francis J. Parater (1897–1920), American seminarian
- Giuseppe Paratore (1876–1967), politician, President of the Italian Senate (1952–1953)
- Clara Petacci (1912–1945), mistress of the Italian dictator Benito Mussolini *Lot: Ex Evangelici, riquadro 89*
- Liberius Pieterse (1905–1973), Dutch Capuchin Franciscan friar
- Antonio Pietrangeli, (1919–1968), film director and screenwriter *Lot: Nuovo reparto, riquadro 88, tomba a terra n. 29*
- Camilla Ravera (1889–1988), politician and partisan *Lot: Famedio del PCI, nuovo reparto, riquadro 8 distinti*
- Adelaide Ristori (1822–1906), stage actress *Lot: Vecchio reparto, riquadro 11*
- George Santayana (1863–1952), American/Spanish philosopher, essayist, poet, and novelist *Lot: Pantheon de la Obra Pía española*
- Giuseppe Saragat (1898–1988), politician, President of Italy (1964–1971) *Lot: Zona ampliamento, riquadro 147, cappella n. 8*
- Henricus Smeulders, O.Cist. Apostolic Delegate to Canada
- Antonio Starabba di Rudinì (1839–1908), politician, Mayor of Palermo (1863–1866) and Prime Minister of Italy (1891–1892, 1896–1898) *Lot: Altopiano Pincetto, v.le delle cappelle, riquadro 58*
- Fidelis von Stotzingen O.S.B. (1871–1947), German Abbot Primate, (1913–1947)
- Palmiro Togliatti (1893–1964), politician and partisan *Lot: Nuovo reparto, Famedio del PCI, riquadro 8 distinti*
- Cyril Toumanoff (1913–1997), Russian-born American historian and genealogist of Armenian-Georgian descent *Lot: cappella dei Cavalieri di Malta*
- Giuseppe Ungaretti (1888–1970), modernist poet, journalist, essayist *Lot: Arciconfraternita, scalinata fronte riquadro 145, lotto 3, gradone 3, loculo n. 59*
- Luigi Zampa (1905–1991), film director and screenwriter *Lot: Rampa Caracciolo, fila IV, n. 50*
- Riccardo Zanella (1875–1959), Fiuman politician, President of the Free State of Fiume (1921–1924) *Lot: Gruppo I monumentale, cappella R, fila 5, loculo n. 4*
- Israel Zolli (1881–1956), Jewish convert to Catholicism, professor, author *Lot: Nuovo reparto, riquadro 45, primo piano, galleria XIII*

=== 21st century ===
- Ferruccio Amendola, (1930–2001), film actor and voice actor *Lot: Bassopiano Pincetto, scaglione Tiburtino fila XI loculo A sotto gallerie 10/11*
- Giulio Andreotti (1919–2013), politician, Prime Minister of Italy (1972–1973, 1976–1979, 1989–1992) *Lot: Arciconfraternita 2, riquadro 149, tomba n. 35*
- Clio Maria Bittoni (1934-2024), Companion of the President of Italy (2006-2015)
- Armando Cossutta (1926–2015), politician and partisan *Lot: Famedio del PCI, nuovo reparto*
- Ivan Dias (1936–2017), Cardinal, Archbishop of Bombay *Lot: Sacello di Propaganda Fide*
- Ciccio Ingrassia, (1922–2003), film actor *Lot: Vecchio reparto, riquadro 18, muro esterno fronte riquadro 19, fila 2, loculo n. 59*
- Laura Latini (1969–2012), voice actress *Lot: Nuovo reparto, riquadro 60, piano terra superiore, passaggio C, gruppo 1, fila 1, loculo n. 1*
- Oreste Lionello, (1927–2009), film actor and voice actor *Lot: Nuovo reparto, riquadro 85, cappella 3, piano terra, fila 1, loculo 19*
- Carlo Lizzani, (1922–2013), film director and screenwriter *Lot: Vecchio reparto, riquadro 33, fila 97, tomba a terra n. 337*
- Luigi Magni, (1928–2013), film director and screenwriter *Lot: Zona ampliamento, riquadro 132, tomba a terra n. 122*
- Siniša Mihajlović (1969–2022), Serbian footballer and manager *Lot: Zona ampliamento, riquadro 119, galleria 2, fila 2, loculo n. 6*
- Chiara Corbella Petrillo, (1984-2012), Italian Catholic public speaker and mother known for her faith amidst her battle with cancer, recognized as a Servant of God by the Catholic Church
- Gillo Pontecorvo, (1919–2006), film director and screenwriter *Lot: Zona ampliamento, riquadro 132, tomba n. 124*
- Alfredo Reichlin (1925–2017), politician and partisan *Lot: Famedio del PCI, nuovo reparto*
- Alberto Sordi, OMRI (1920–2003), film actor and director *Lot: Zona ampliamento, riquadro 145, cappella 2*
- Bud Spencer (born Carlo Pedersoli, 1929–2016), film actor, Olympic swimmer and water polo player*.
- Bruno Trentin (1926–2007), politician and trade unionist *Lot: Famedio del PCI, nuovo reparto*
- Alida Valli (1921–2006), film actress *Lot: Nuovo reparto, riquadro 85, cappella 3, piano terra, fila 1, loculo n. 20*

== Gallery ==
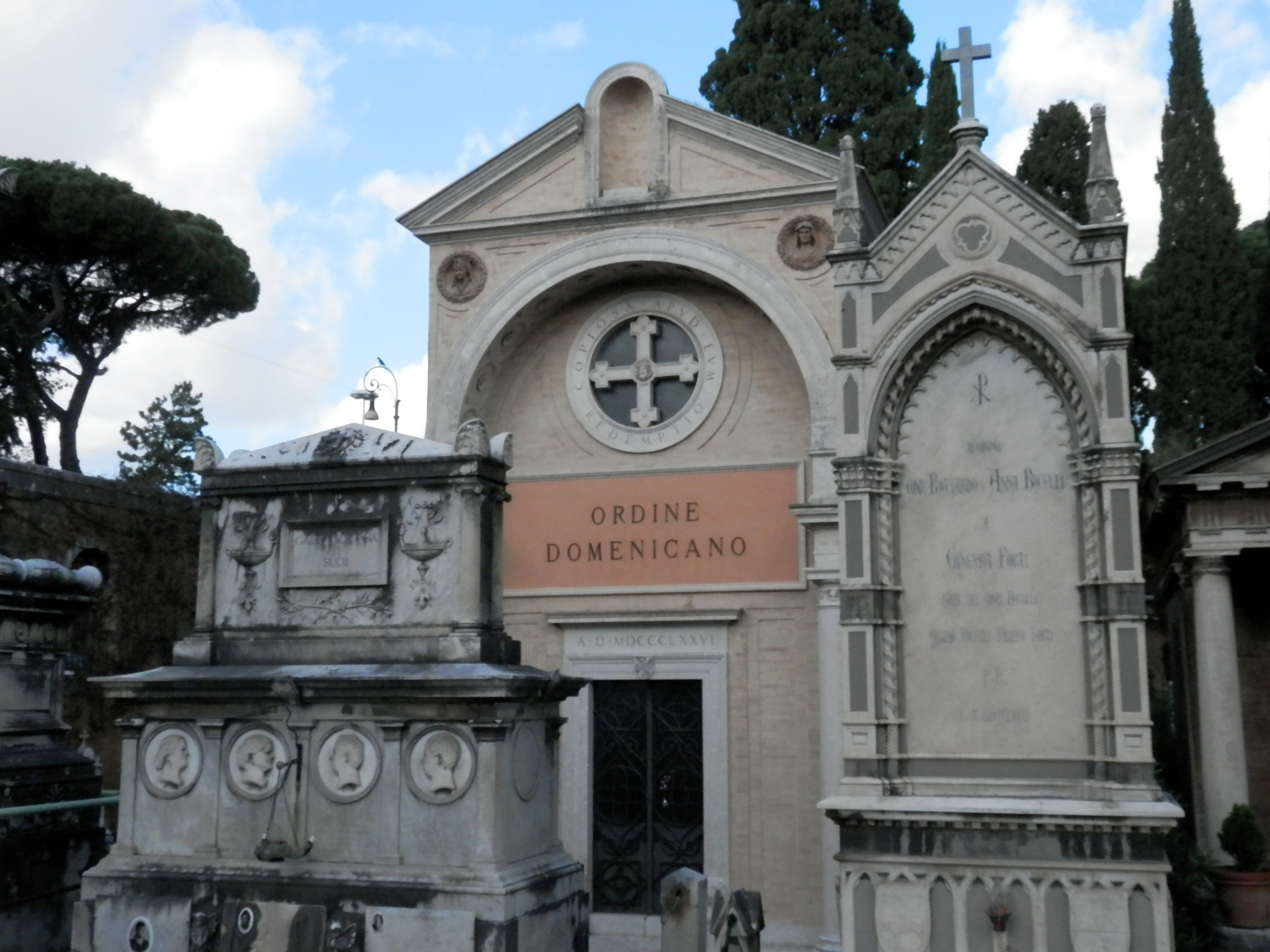
Burial chapel of Dominican Order

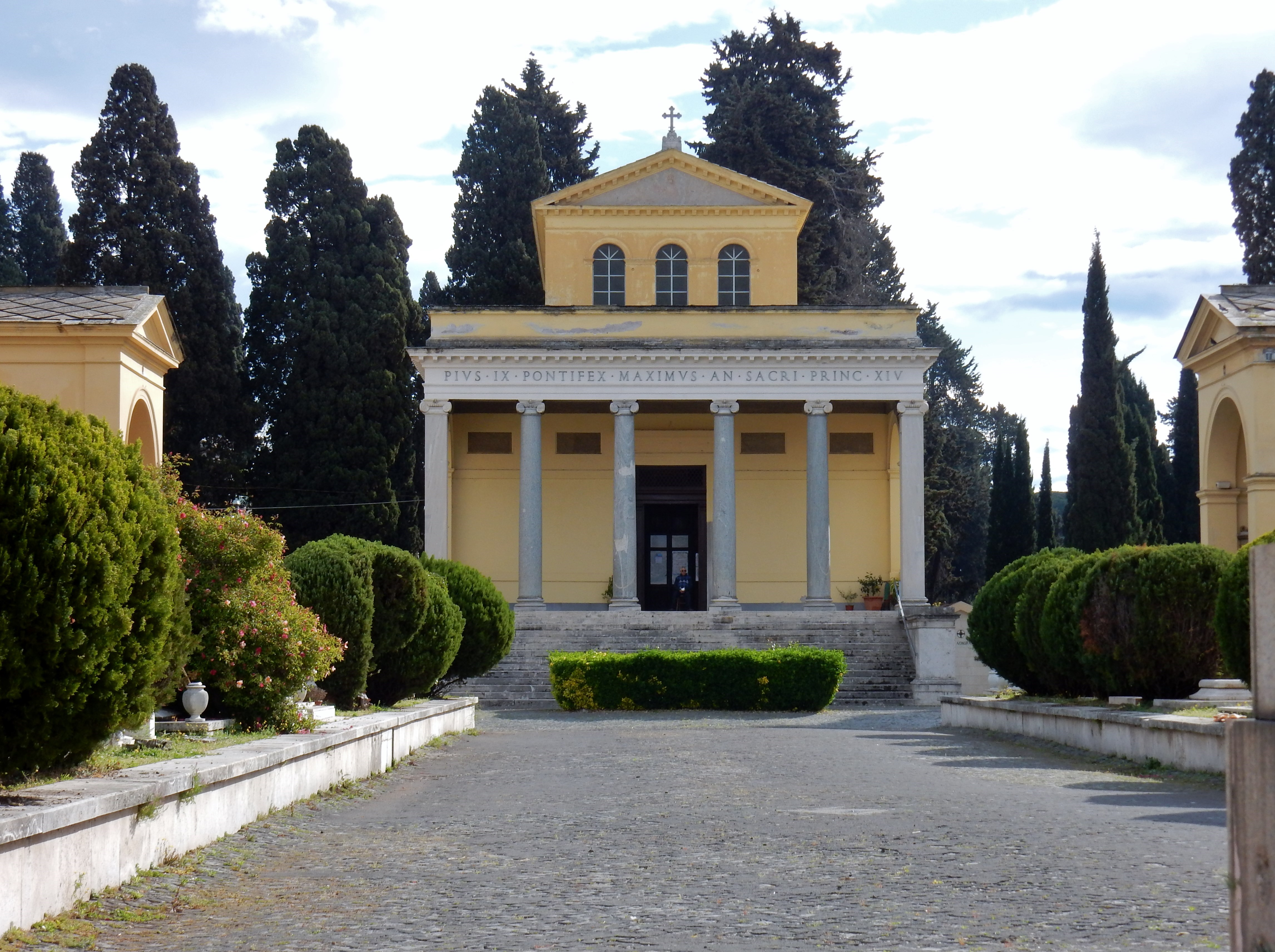
Cemetery church of Santa Maria della Misericordia

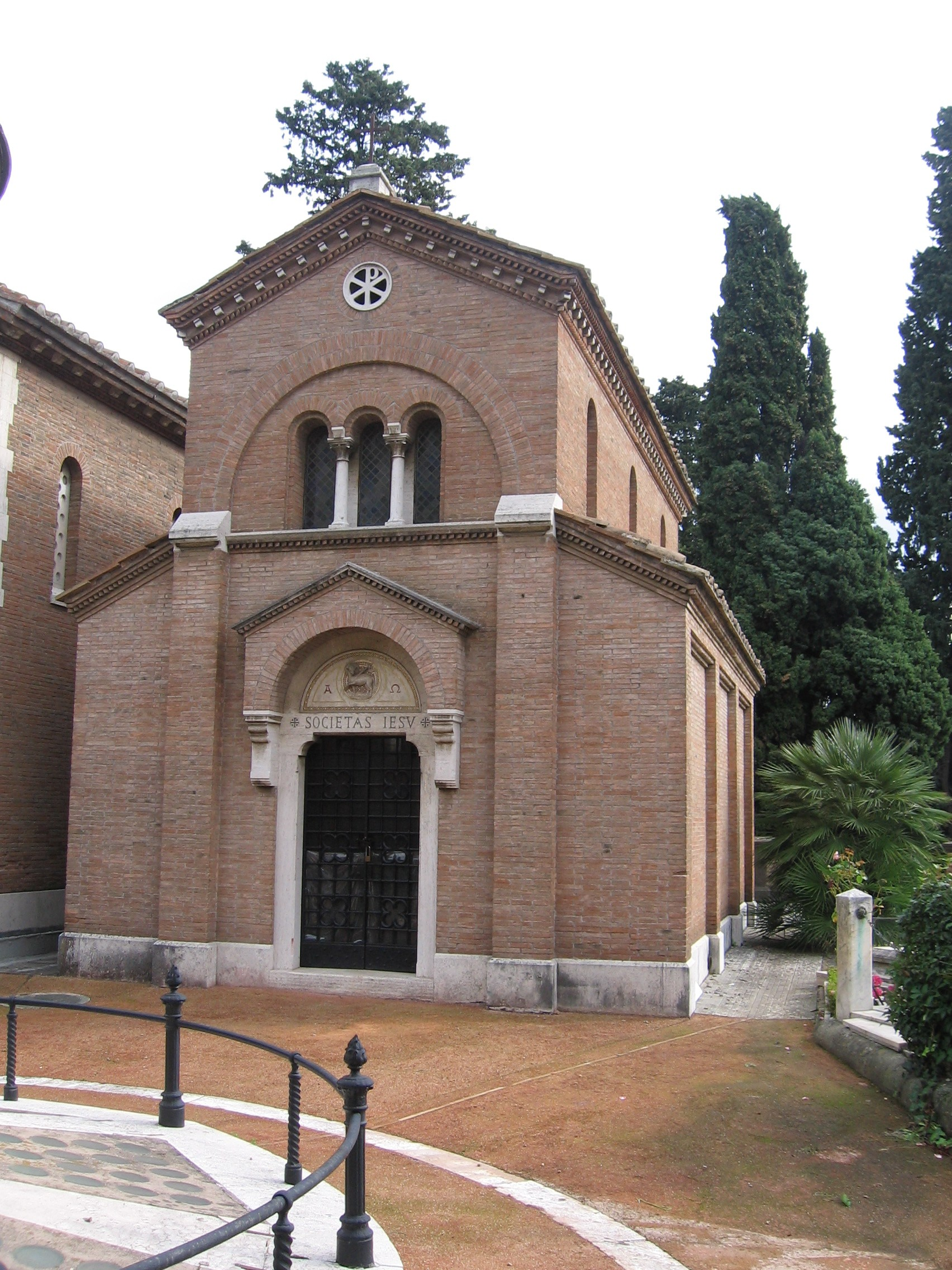
Burial chapel of Jesuits

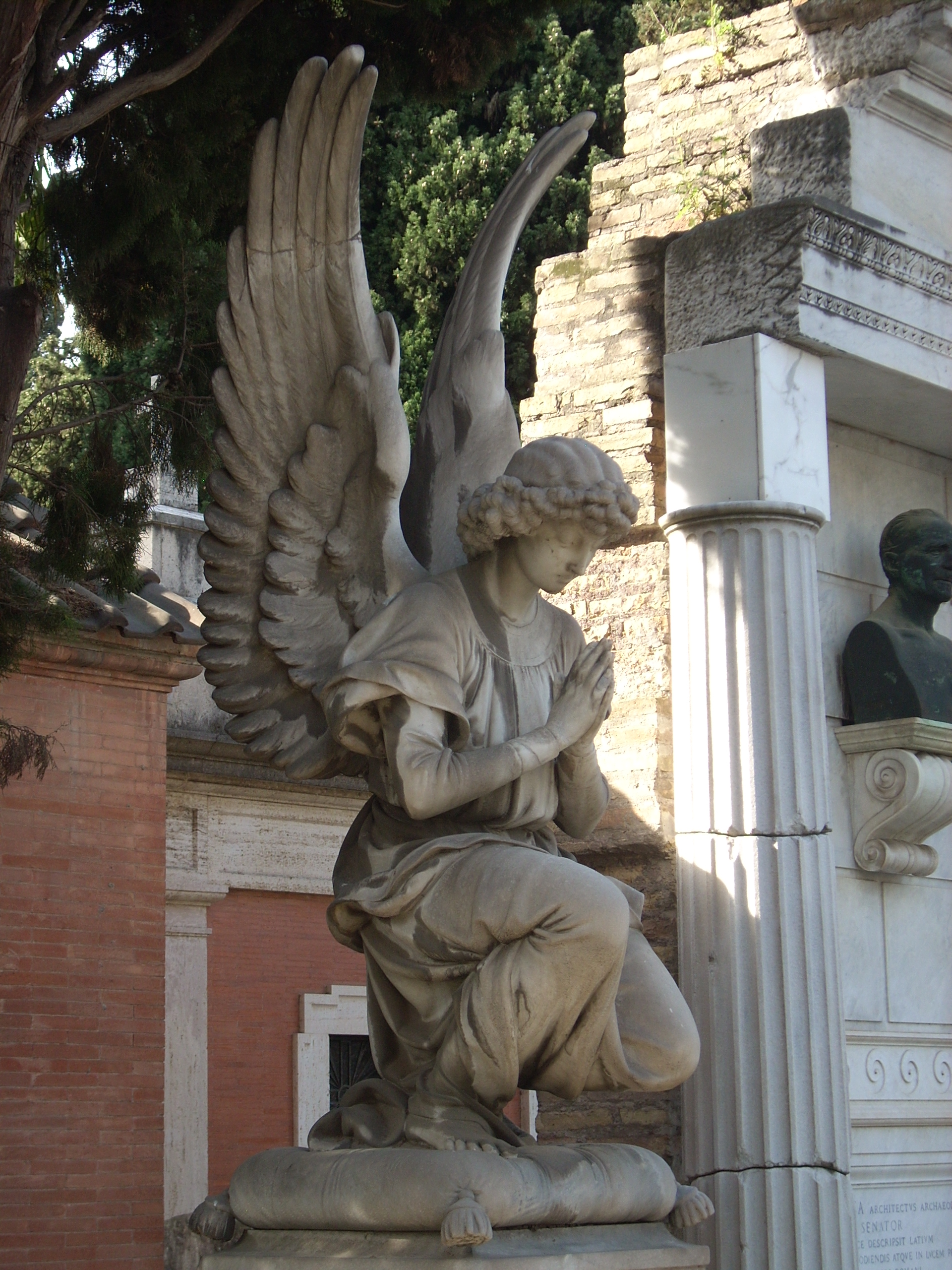
Statue of an angel in prayer

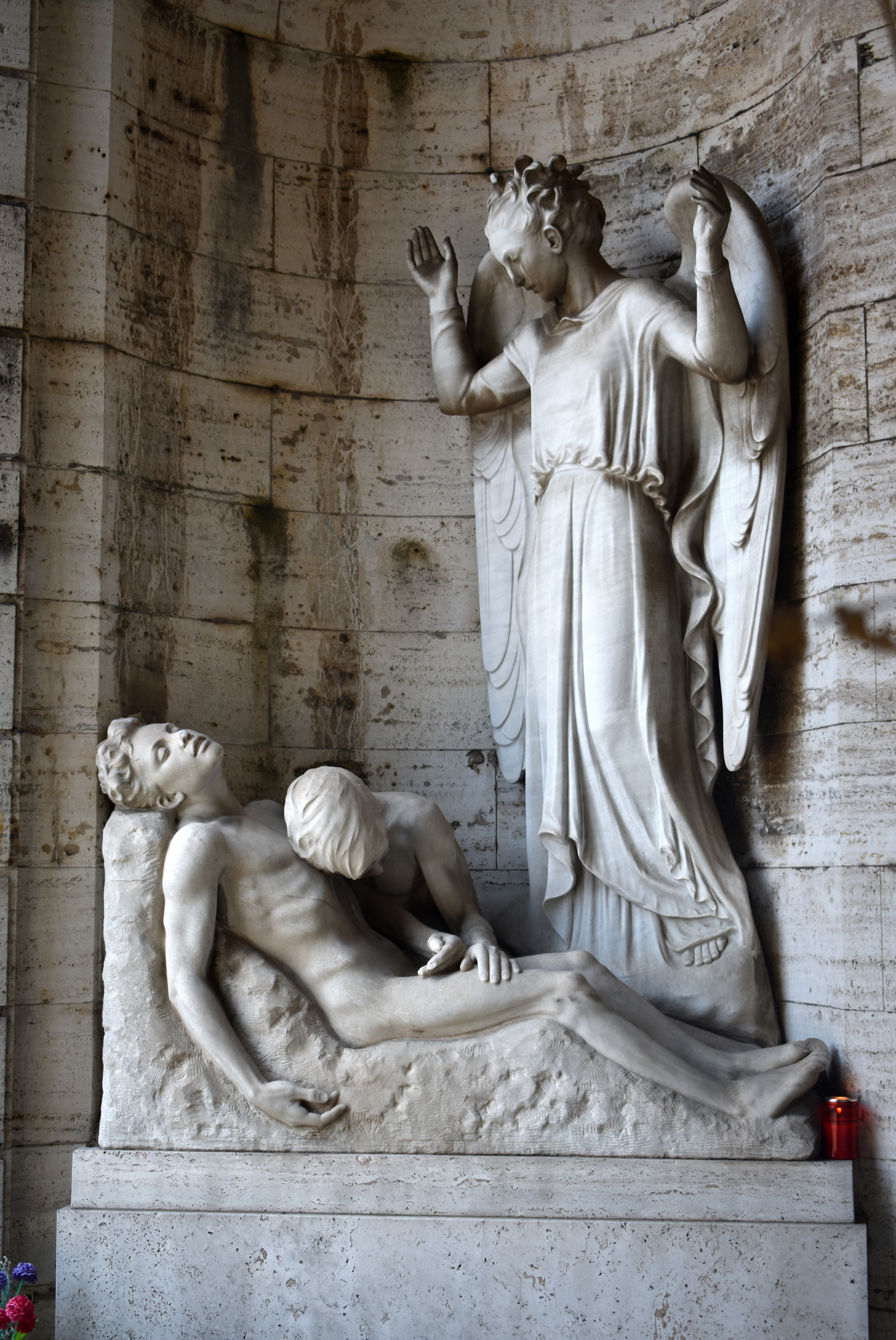
Grave monument of Lombardi family

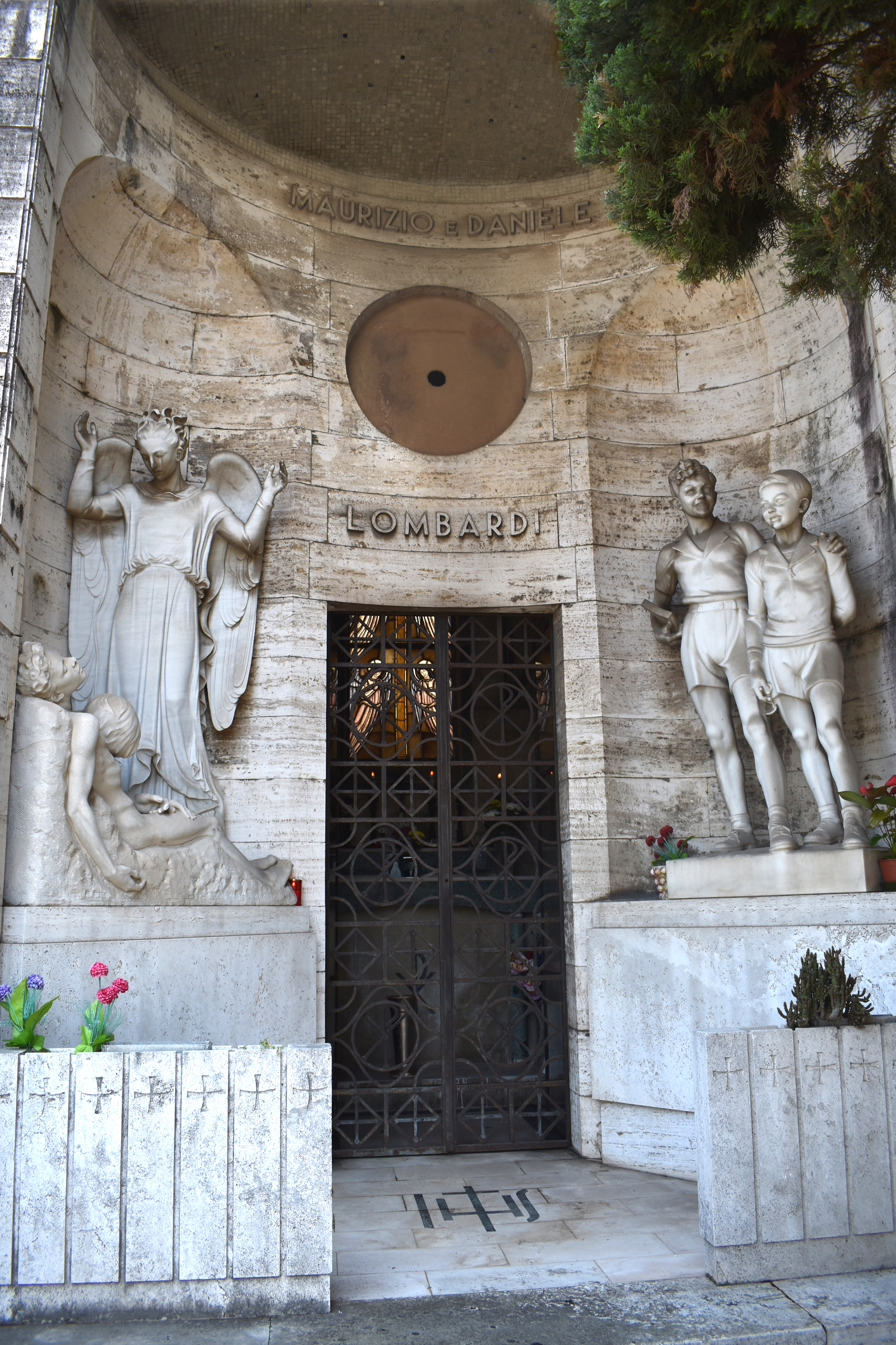
Lombardi mausoleum with life-size statues of brothers Maurizio and Daniele

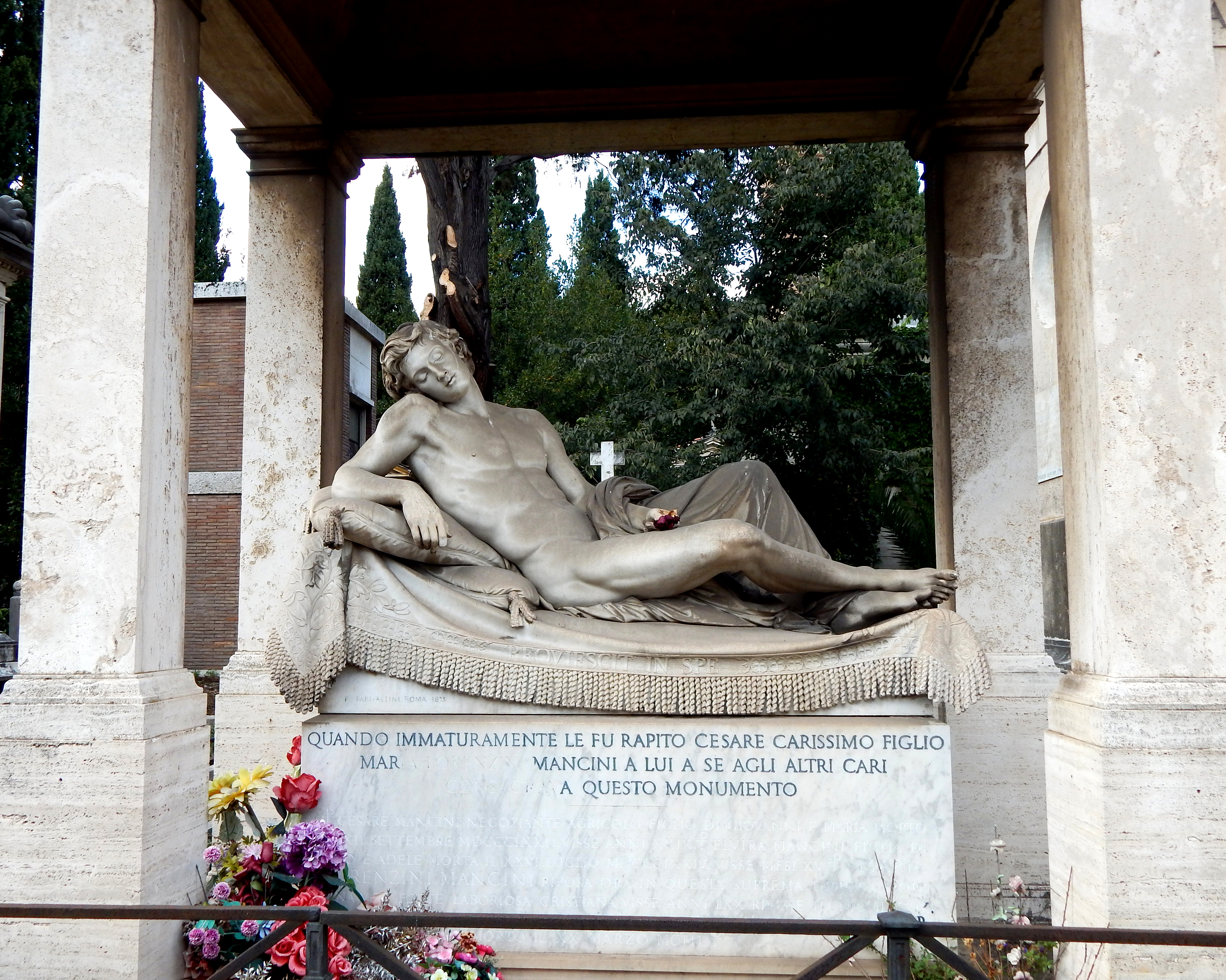
Mancini monument

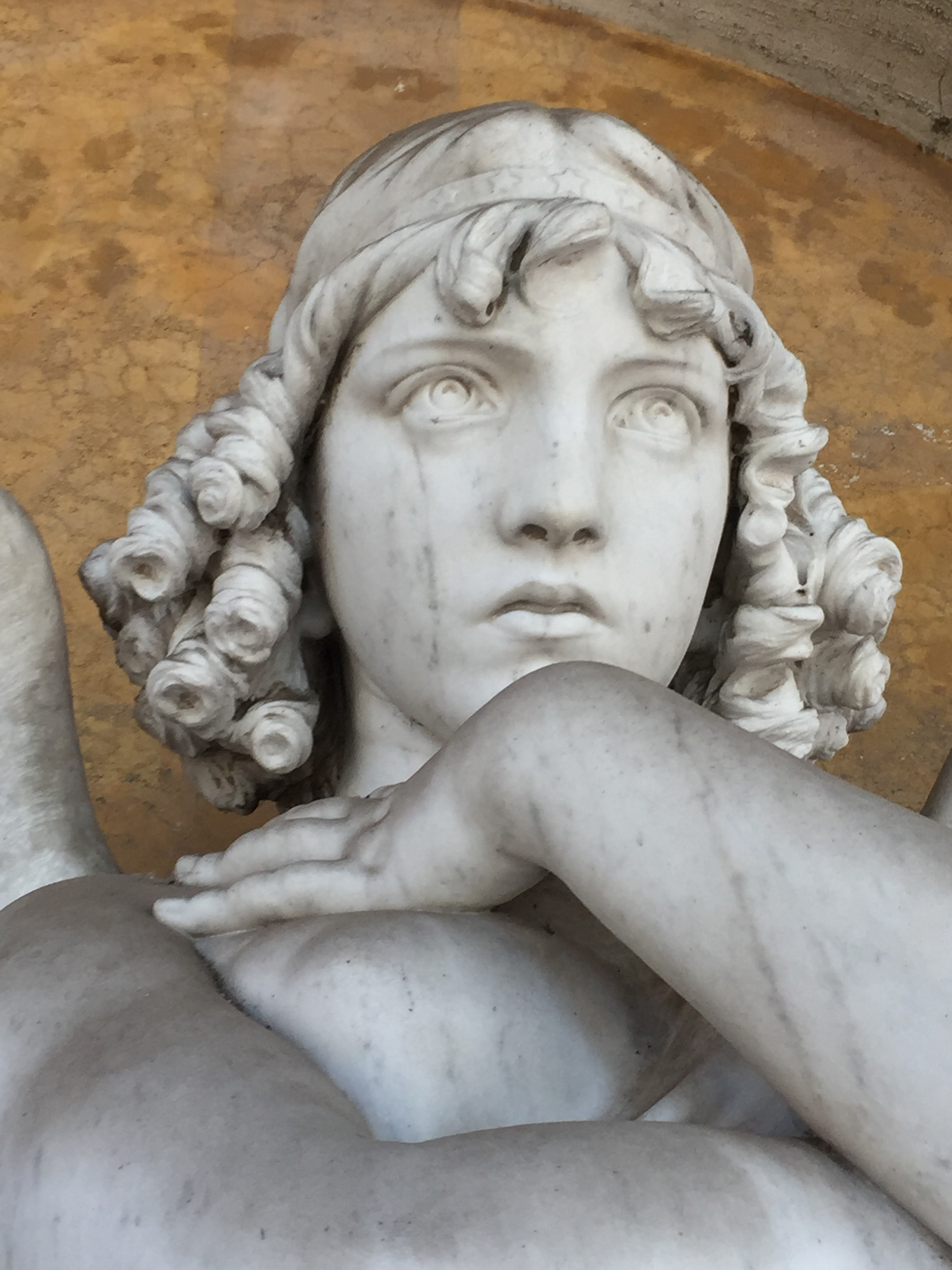
Detail of Monteverde angel

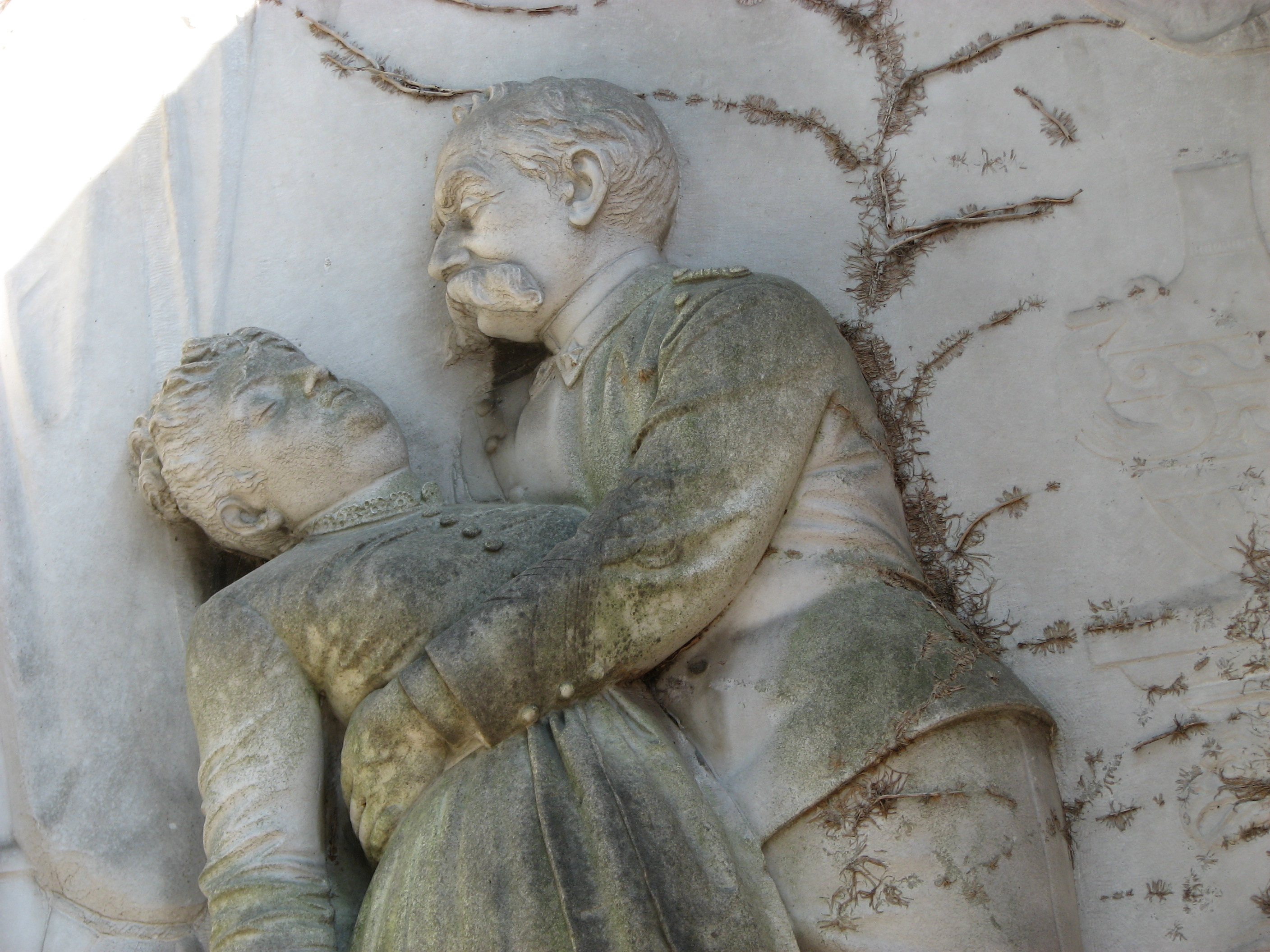
Funerary relief of a married couple

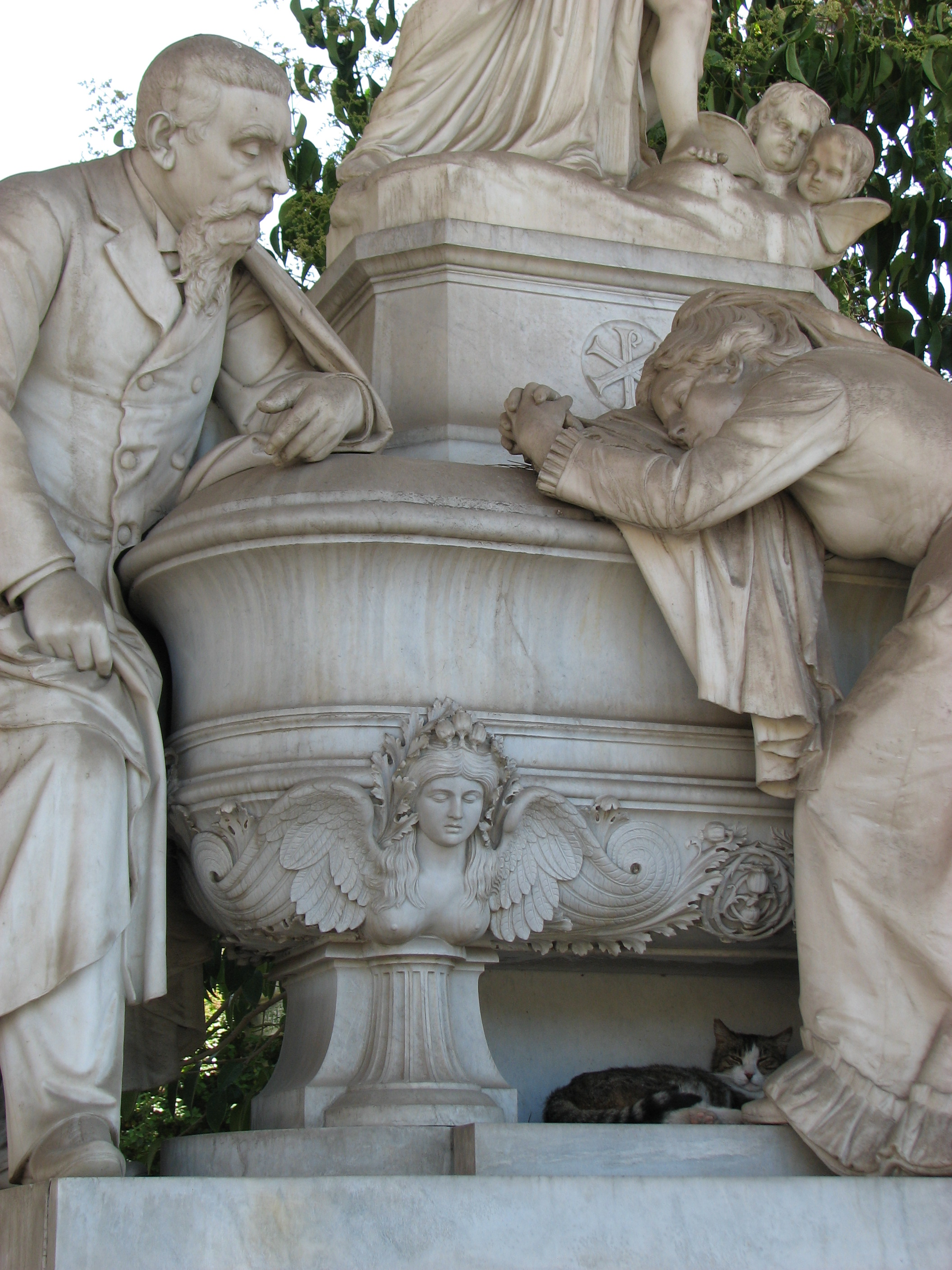
Grave monument of Vitale family by sculptor Francesco Fabi Altini (1830-1906)

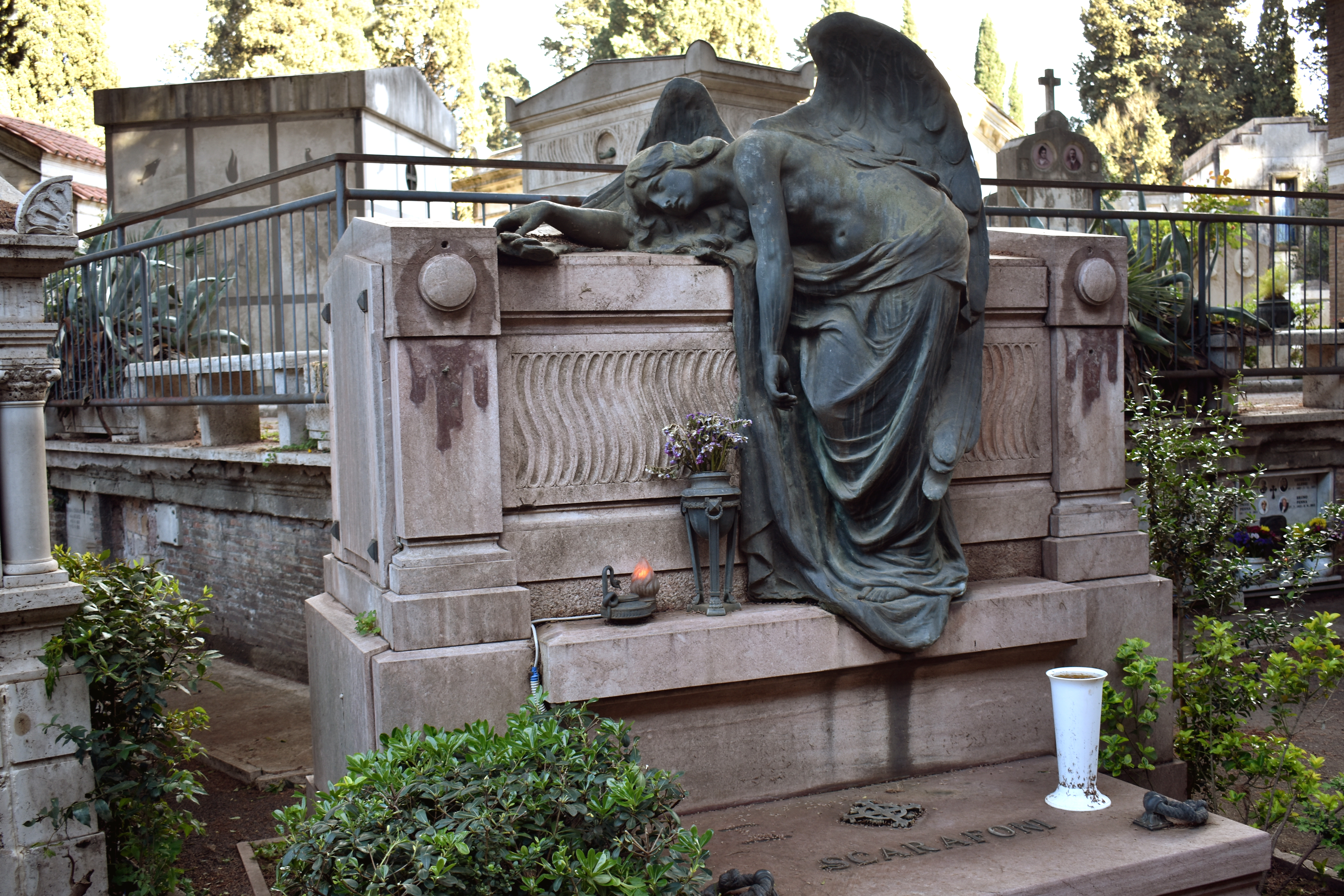
Mourning angel

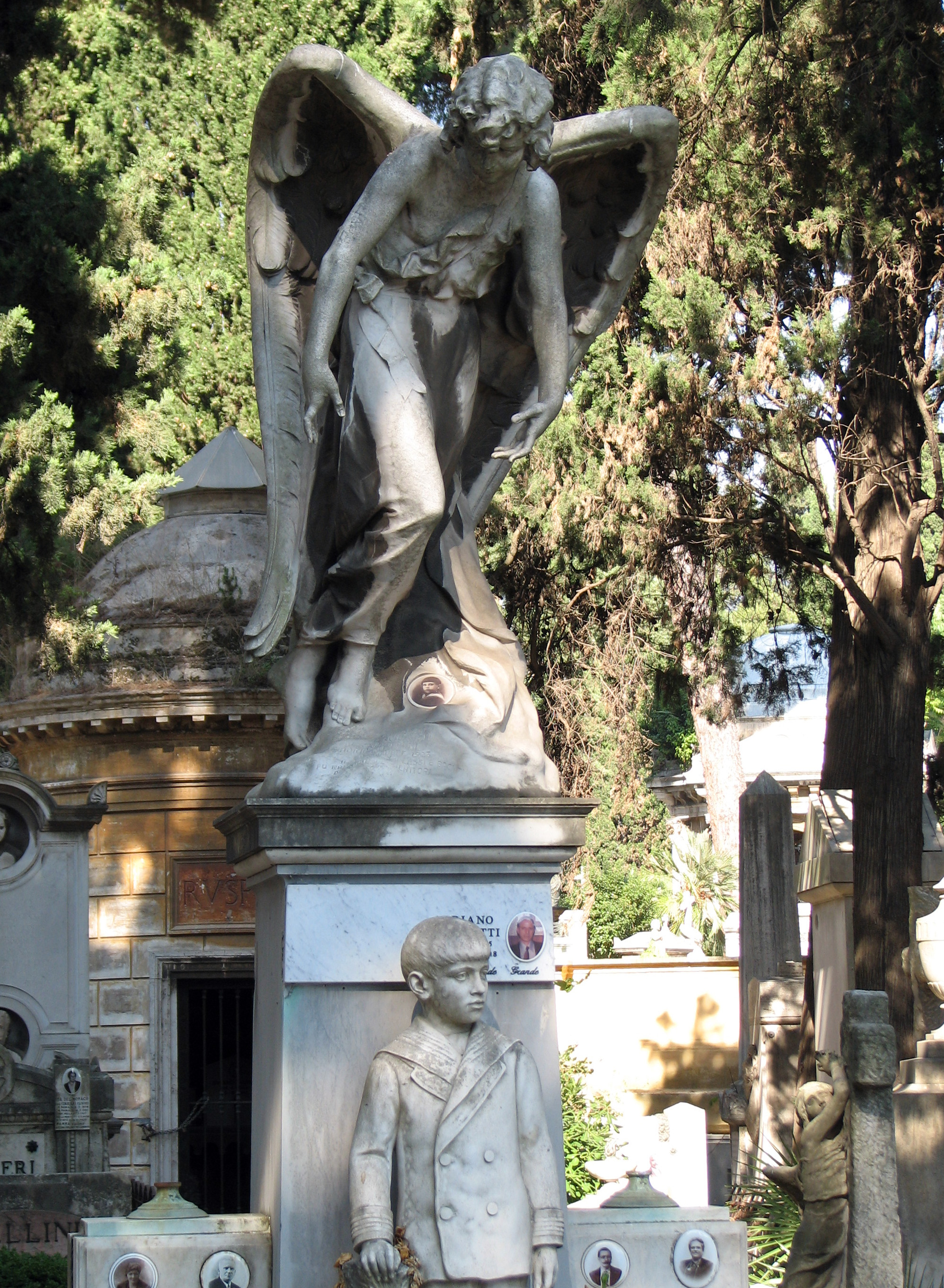
Monumental tomb of Adriano Schiavetti who died at age 9 (1914-1923)

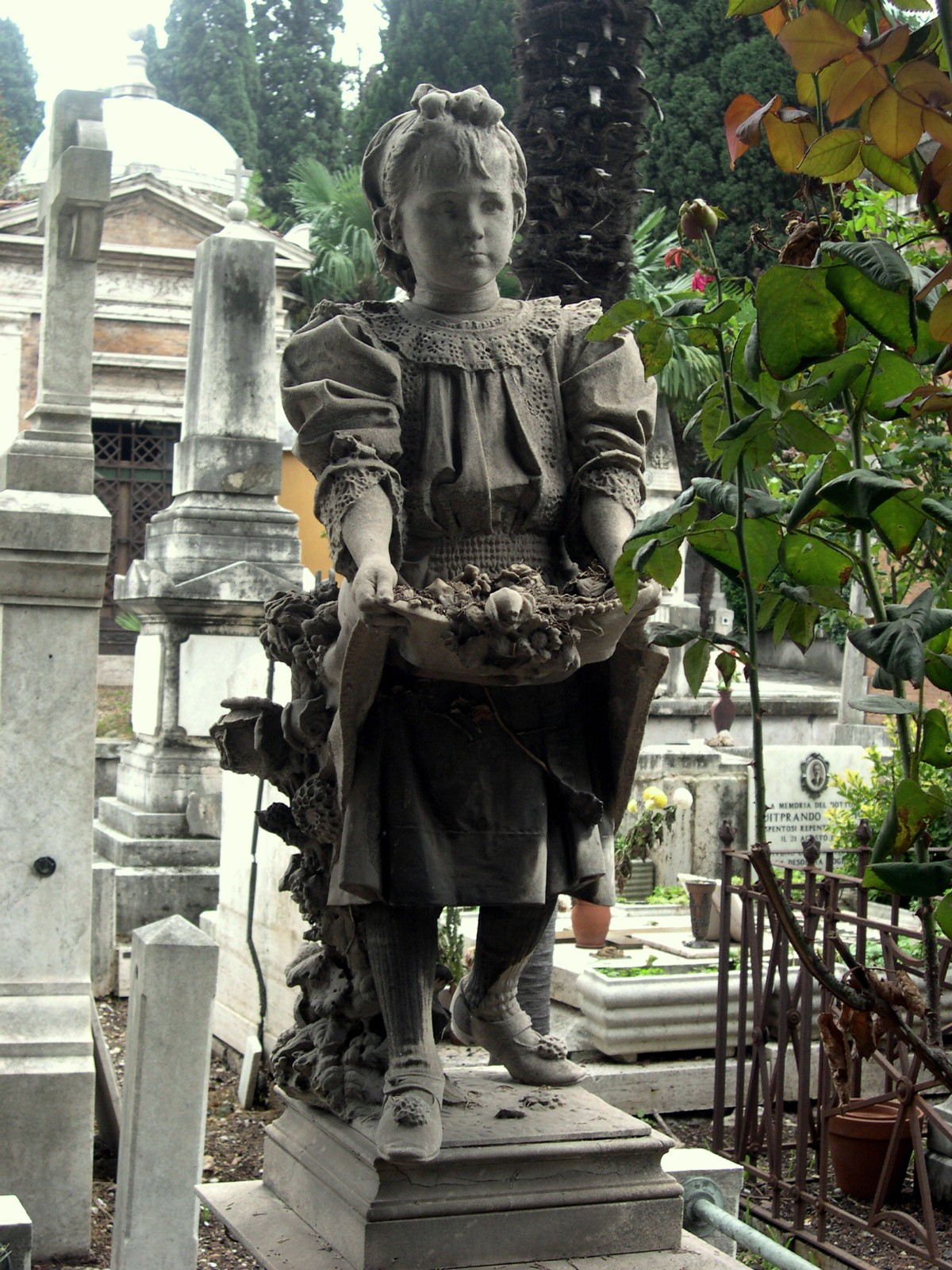
Life-size statue of a little girl

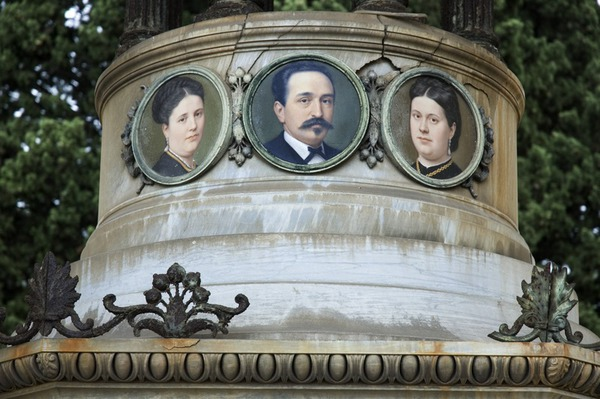
Enamel portraits of deceased by Luigi Severati

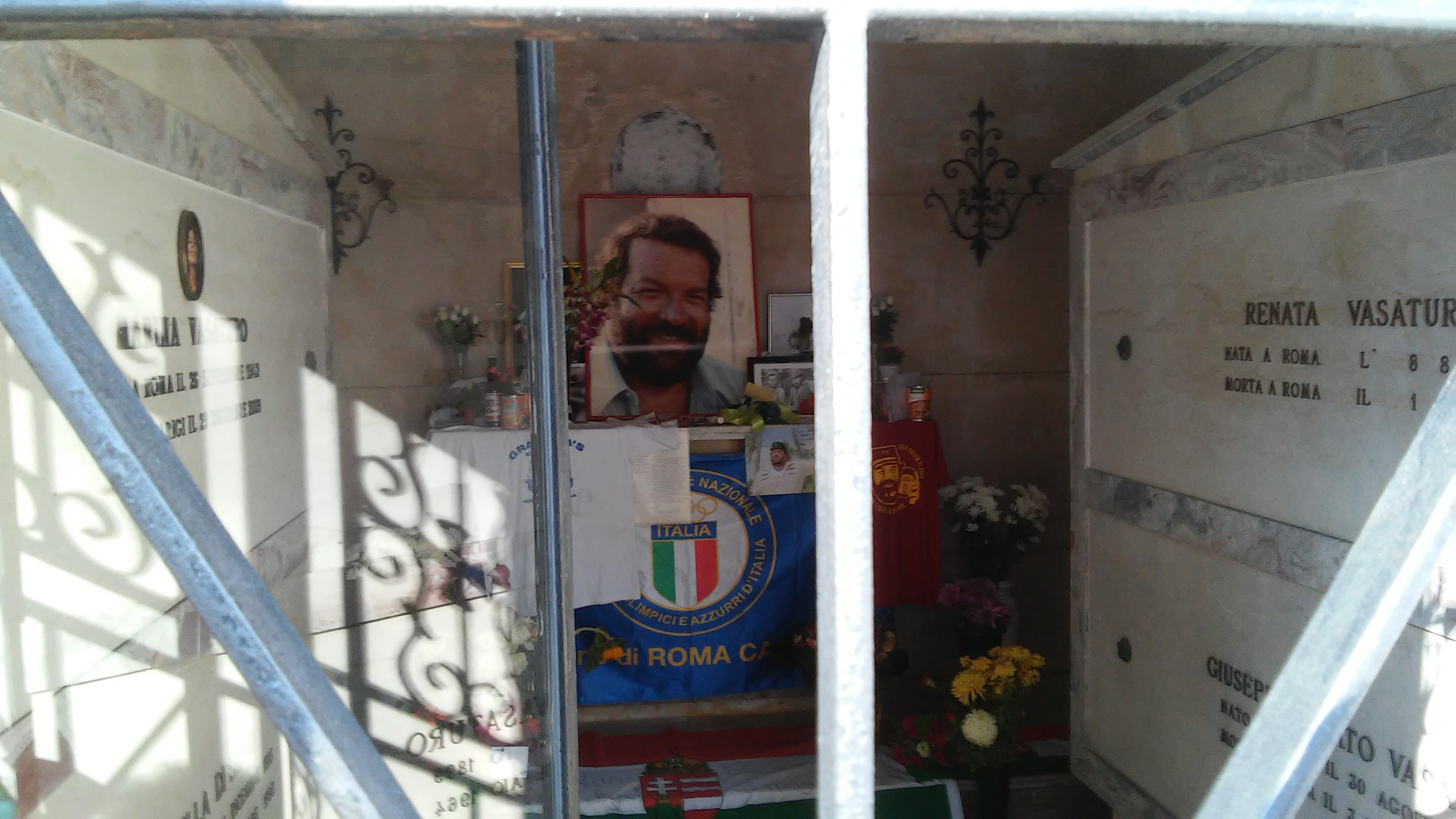
Interior of Bud Spencer mausoleum

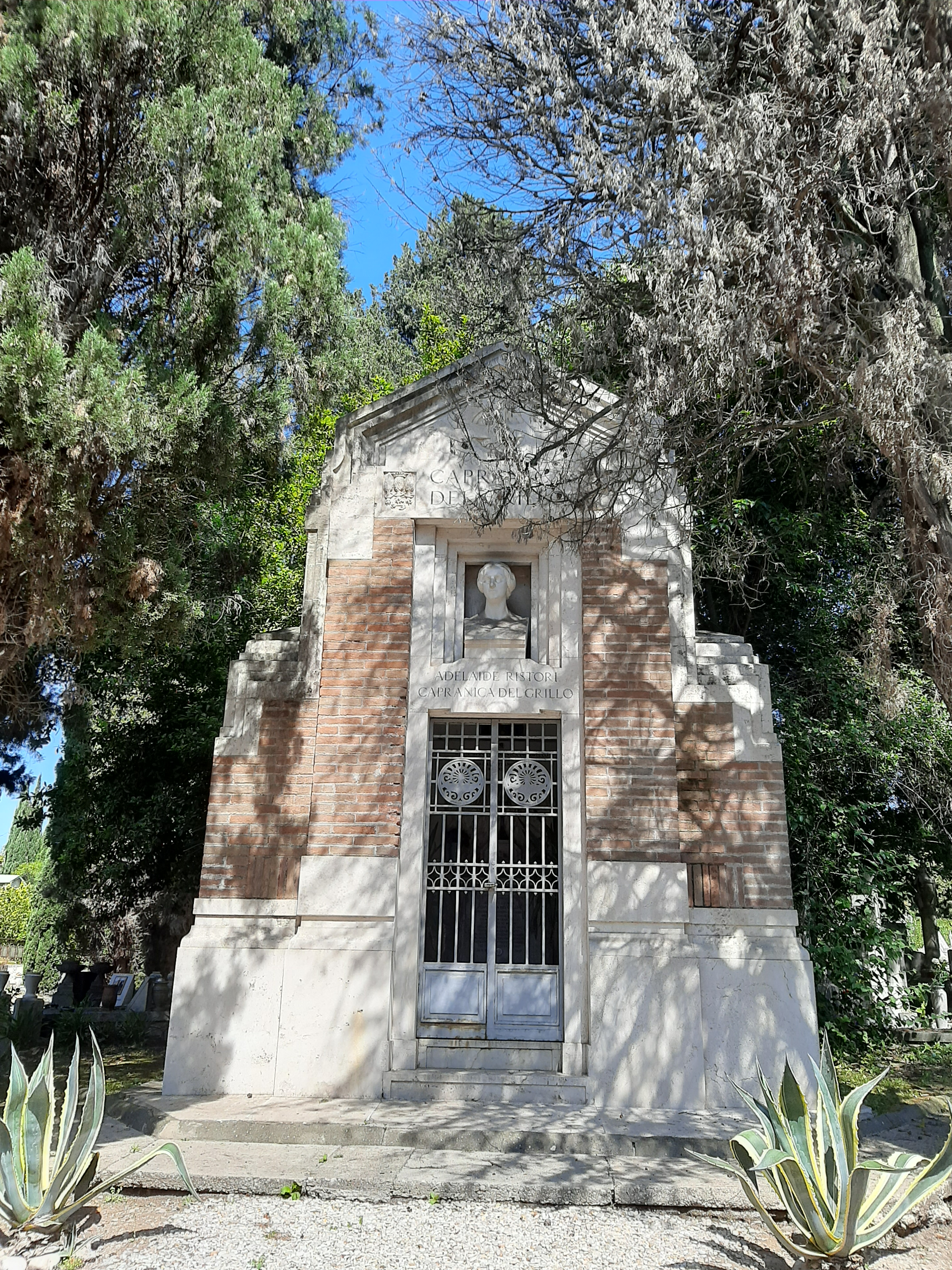
Mausoleum of Adelaide Ristori

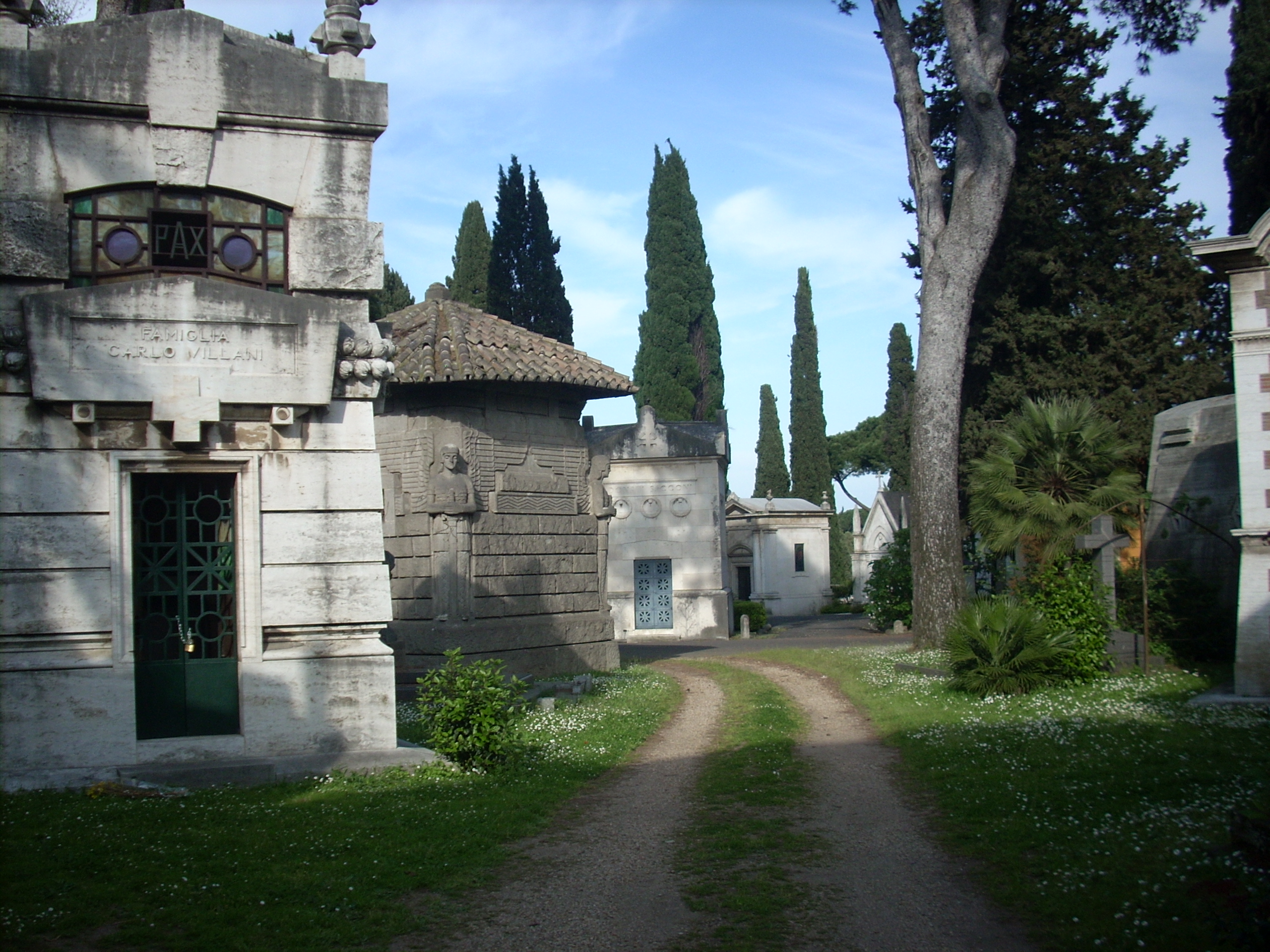
Family mausoleums in Pincetto section of Verano

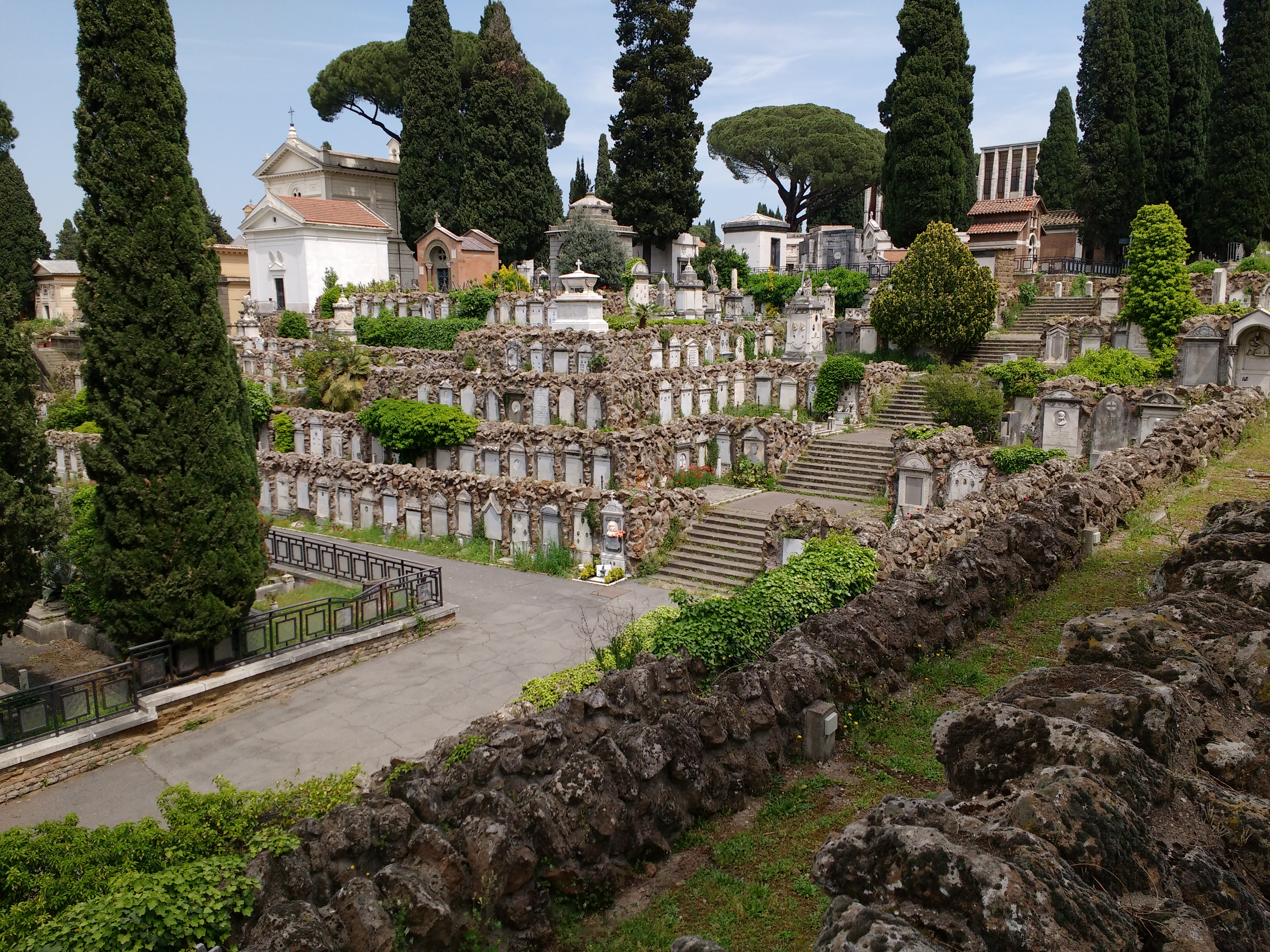
General view of Verano

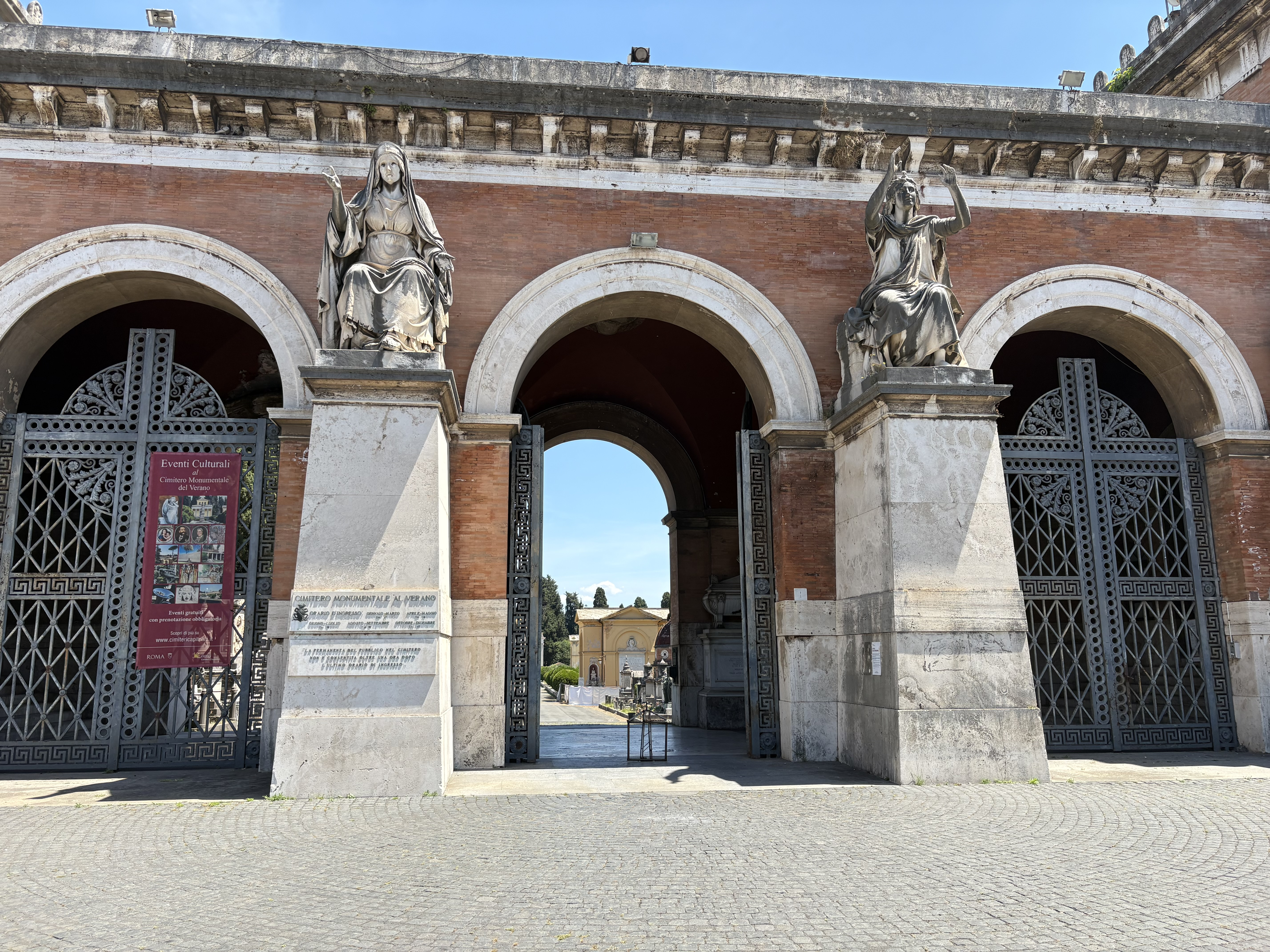
The entrance to Verano

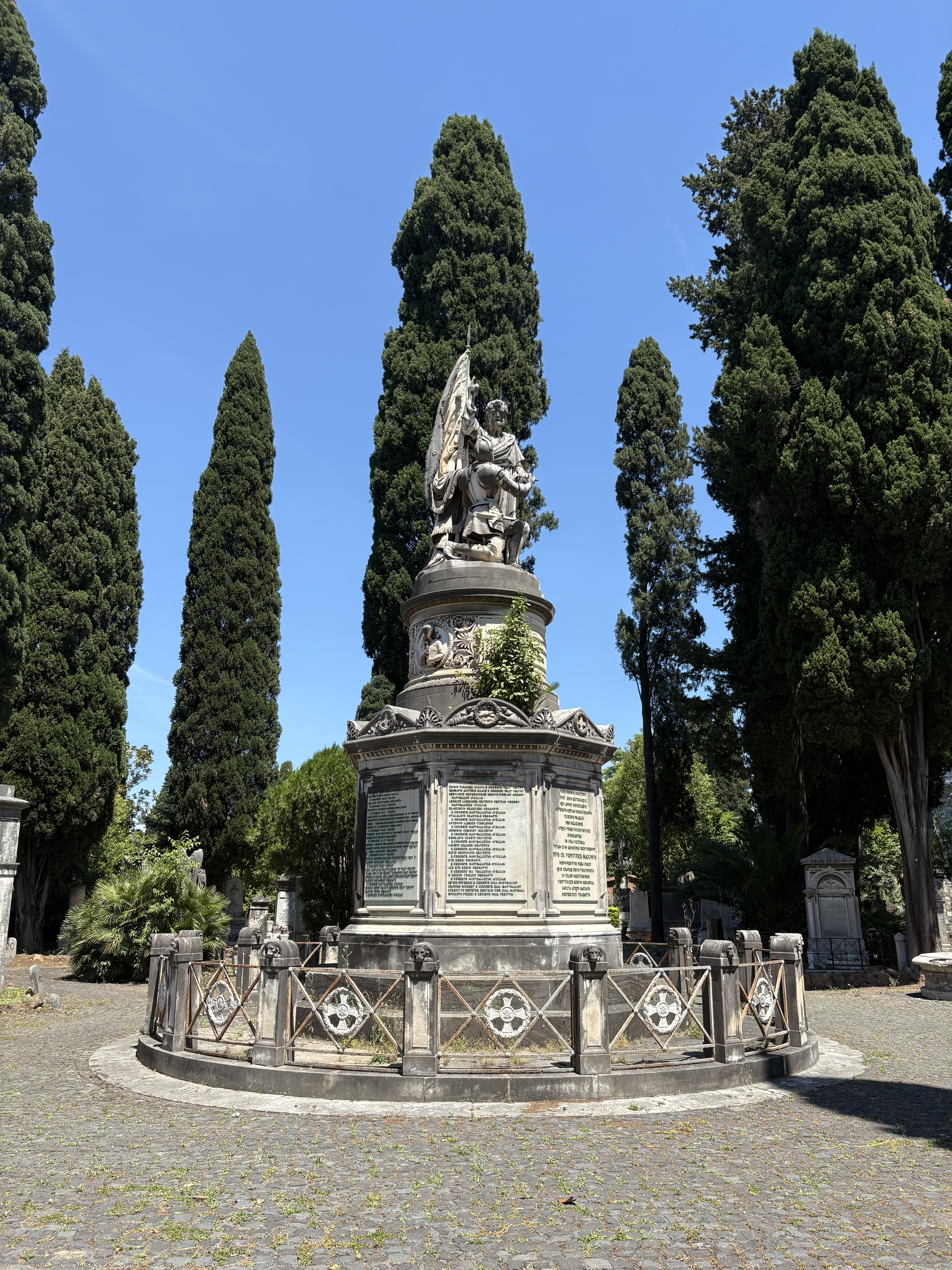
A mausoleum with many names on it

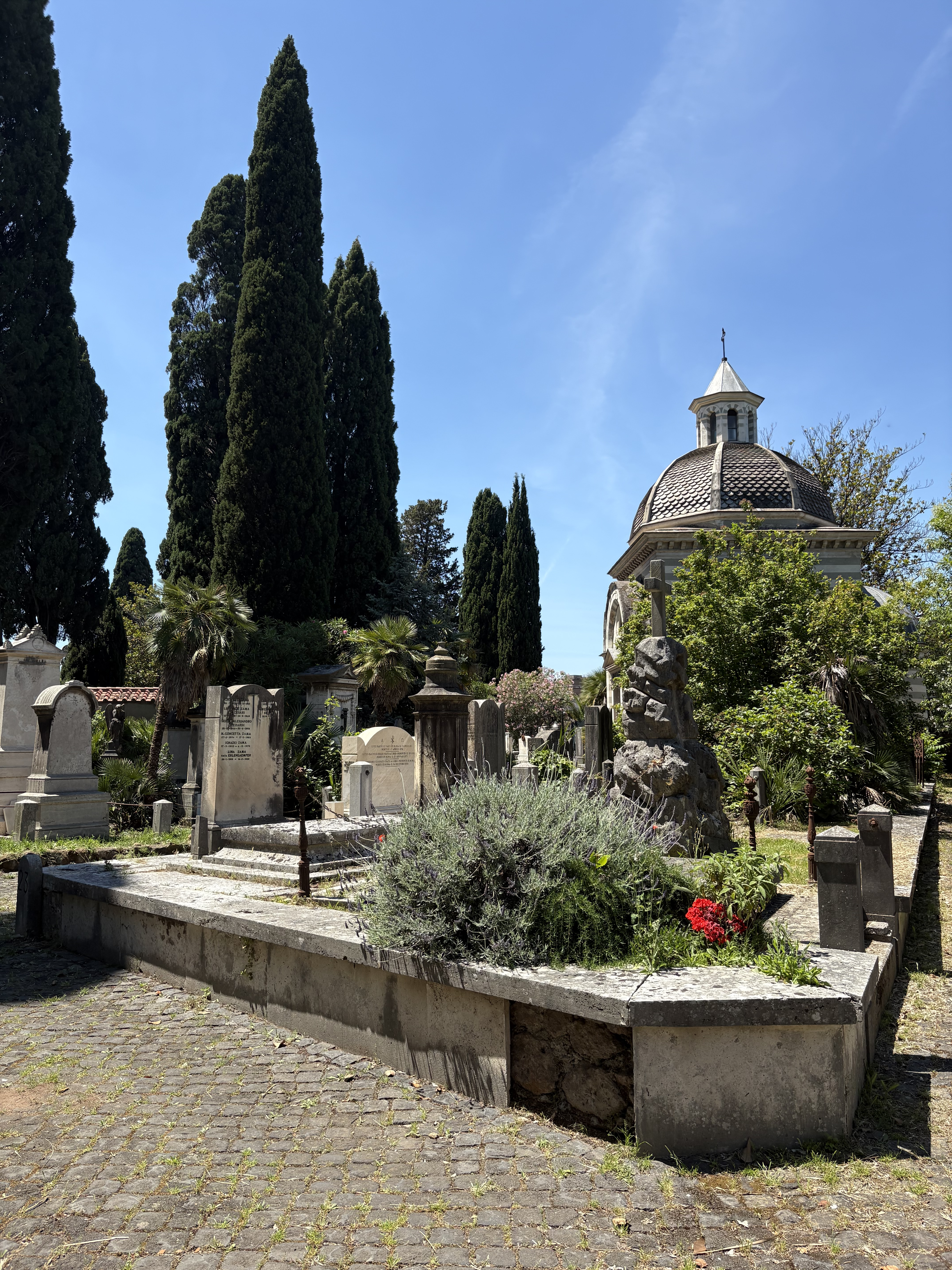
Verano is full of nature.

== See also ==
- San Lorenzo fuori le mura

== Bibliography ==
- Roberto Ragione, Il cimitero comunale monumentale Campo Verano a Roma. Orografia, morfologia e condizione geologica del sito, in A. Carannante, S. Lucchetti, S. Menconero, A. Ponzetta (a cura di), Metodi, applicazioni, tecnologie. Colloqui del dottorato di ricerca in Storia, Disegno e Restauro dell’Architettura, Sapienza Università Editrice, Roma 2022, pp. 131-143.
- Roberto Ragione, L’ordine domenicano nel cimitero monumentale Campo Verano a Roma: trasformazioni della cappella funeraria alla fine del XIX secolo, in R. Ravesi, R. Ragione, S. Colaceci (a cura di), Rappresentazione, Architettura e Storia. La diffusione degli ordini religiosi nei paesi del Mediterraneo tra Medioevo ed Età Moderna, tomo I, Atti del Convegno Internazionale (10-11 maggio 2021), Sapienza Università Editrice, Roma 2023, pp. 461-476.
- Roberto Ragione, Il monumento ai caduti franco-pontifici nella campagna militare dell’Agro romano: un memoriale preunitario ‘dimenticato’ nel cimitero monumentale Campo Verano a Roma, in F. Capano, E. Maglio, M. Visone (a cura di), Città e guerra. Difese, distruzioni, permanenze delle memorie e dell’immagine urbana, tomo I - Fonti e testimonianze, Atti del X Convegno Internazionale di Studi “CIRICE 2023” (Napoli, 8-10 giugno 2023), FedOA - Federico II University Press, Napoli 2023, pp. 529-537.
- Roberto Ragione, Il cimitero comunale monumentale Campo Verano a Roma: caratteri distintivi e identitari frutto di una stratificazione nel tempo, in R. Tamborrino (a cura di), Città che si adattano? / Adaptive cities?, tomo II - Adattabilità in circostanze ordinarie, Atti del X Congresso Internazionale “AISU – Torino 2022” (Torino, 6-10 settembre 2022), AISU International Press, Torino 2024, pp. 960-971.
- Roberto Ragione, Legislazione, architettura e società: la nascita del cimitero comunale monumentale Campo Verano a Roma tra Età napoleonica e Restaurazione, in S. Menzinger, M. Folin (a cura di), La città dei giuristi / The City of Jurists, Atti del Seminario dottorale (Roma, 15-16 maggio 2026), AISU International Press, Torino 2026, pp. 86-104.

Preceded by Tomb of the Unknown Soldier (Italy)	Landmarks of Rome; Campo Verano	Succeeded by Torre dei Capocci
