= Laura D'Oriano =

Italian spy (1911–1943)

- Born: 27 September 1911; Constantinople, Ottoman Empire
- Died: 16 January 1943 (aged 31); Forte Bravetta, Rome, Kingdom of Italy
- Cause of death: Execution by firing squad
- Resting place: Campo Verano
- Spouse: Emil Frauholz (m. 1931, separated)
- Children: 2
- Espionage activity
- Allegiance: Allies powers; French Resistance
- Service years: 1940–1942
- Codename: Louise Fremont

Laura D'Oriano (27 September 1911 – 16 January 1943) was an Italian spy for the Allies powers and the French Resistance from 1940 until she was caught in 1942 by Italian counterintelligence. Following a show trial, D'Oriano was executed by firing squad in 1943.

== Early life and family ==
D'Oriano was born on 27 September 1911 in Constantinople, Ottoman Empire (present-day Istanbul, Turkey) to the Italian musicians, Policarpo D'Oriano and Aida Caruana. The eldest of five siblings, the family moved around Europe until 1924 when they settled in Marseille. Her mother ensured that the children learned Italian, and D'Oriano eventually learned to speak five languages. D'Oriano moved to Paris when she was seventeen to become a singer, but she was unsuccessful and returned to live with her family.

In 1931, D'Oriano was married in Nice to a Swiss man, Emil Frauholz, the same year they met. D'Oriano and Frauholz moved to Grasse a few years later and ran a general store before moving to the Frauholz family farm in Bottighofen, Switzerland. They had two daughters together, Renée and Anna. D'Oriano was unhappy in Switzerland. Their family was poor, and as a foreigner she never felt welcome in the community.

D'Oriano eventually left for France to work as a singer. She is commonly reported to have abandoned her family, but her daughter Anna later said it was a mutual agreement between D'Oriano and her husband, and that she occasionally visited them. Frauholz went on to remarry.

== Spying and execution ==
D'Oriano's second attempt at a singing career was also unsuccessful, and she worked several jobs in France. She was recruited by Daniel Pétard in 1940 to work as a spy in exchange for protection from deportation, as she did not have a French residency permit. D'Oriano began working as a spy in France and Italy where she cooperated with the Allies of World War II and the French Resistance. She took the name Louise Fremont, among others, posing as a professional singer and dancer, and spoke with soldiers to collect information from them. She was eventually noticed by Italian counterintelligence, who arrested her on 17 December 1942 while on a train to visit her mother.

After she was caught, D'Oriano was given a show trial in Rome on 15 January 1943. The trial targeted her character, accusing her of prostitution among other things. She was executed by firing squad at Forte Bravetta on 16 January 1943. Her body was placed in a mass grave, but her father later recovered the body and had her buried in Campo Verano.

== Legacy ==
D'Oriano's daughter, Anna Keller, disapproved of how D'Oriano's legacy and how she is portrayed. According to Keller, descriptions of her spying are simplified, embellished, or speculative.

D'Oriano was the subject of a 2010 documentary, Il caso Laura D'Oriano, directed by Andrea Adolfo Bettinetti. She is one of the three protagonists in the historical novel The Forger, the Spy, and the Bombmaker. D'Oriano has been compared to the spy Mata Hari.
