= Edita Broglio =

Latvian artist (1886–1977)

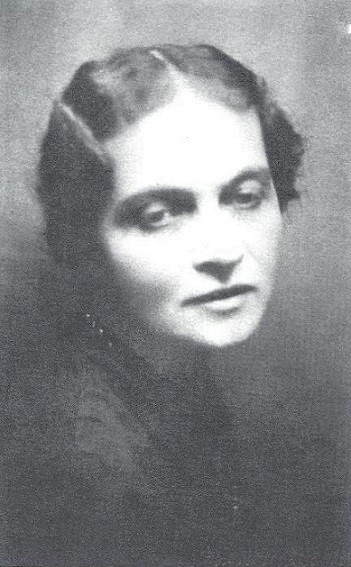
Edita Broglio

Edita Broglio (1886–1977) was a Latvian artist known for her paintings in the genre of magic realism.

She was born Edita Walterowna von Zur Muehlen on November 26, 1886 in the town of Smiltene, northeast of Riga. From 1908 to 1910 she studied at the Konigsberg Art Academy in East Prussia.

Broglio left Latvia in 1910, settling in Rome. She married Mario Broglio, and together they founded the Italian art magazine Valori plastici. She died in Rome in 1977.
