= Chiara Corbella Petrillo =

Italian Servant of God

Servant of God Chiara Corbella Petrillo
- Born: 9 January 1984; Rome, Italy
- Hometown: Rome, Italy
- Died: 13 June 2012 (aged 28); Pian della Carlotta, Cerveteri, Rome, Italy
- Resting place: Campo Verano, Rome, Italy

Chiara Corbella Petrillo (9 January 1984 – 13 June 2012) was an Italian Catholic public speaker and a mother known for her faith amidst her battle with cancer.

Chiara met her future husband Enrico Petrillo in 2002 when both were on a pilgrimage to Medjugorje. Both Chiara and Enrico were admirers of the Franciscans and made several pilgrimages to Assisi. They were married on 21 September 2008, with her spiritual director officiating, a Franciscan friar. The pair had two children in 2009 and 2010, who both died within half an hour of their births due to medical complications which were diagnosed when Chiara was pregnant. Chiara and Enrico took to speaking at pro-life events in Rome following the births and deaths of their first two children. When Chiara conceived a third child, once again she was diagnosed with medical issues during her pregnancy that turned out to be carcinoma, later deemed to be terminal. The cancer spread to places such as her tongue and liver, which made sight and talking troublesome as the illness progressed.

Following her death, her cause for beatification was long discussed. Concrete steps were taken in 2018 with the formal launch of her cause at the Lateran Basilica on 21 September (her wedding anniversary) in 2018, entitling her as a Servant of God.

== Biography ==
Chiara Corbella was born on 9 January 1984 in Rome as the second of two children to Roberto Corbella and Maria Anselma Ruzziconi; her elder sister being Elisa. Her baptism was celebrated on 5 February at the Roman church of Santi Marcellino e Pietro al Laterano, where she also received her First Communion on 29 May 1994 and her Confirmation on 8 October 1995.

In the summer of 2002 she was on a vacation in Croatia with some high school classmates when she decided to make a brief stop in Medjugorje where her elder sister had been visiting. On 2 August 2002 she first met Enrico Petrillo (then aged 23) at Medjugorje and the two soon started a relationship; Enrico was there with the Charismatic Renewal on a pilgrimage. The pair first met in a crowded hotel dining room and split up several times but each time got back together. The pair broke up in 2006 but reunited after Chiara made another visit to Medjugorje. On another occasion after a break up, Chiara had gone with her father and sister to Australia. Upon her return she saw an email from Enrico who was interested in rekindling their relationship. On 8 December 2006 she was in Assisi for a vocational course conducted by the Order of Friars Minor and there she first met Vito D'Amato whom she asked to be her spiritual director. Enrico had been impressed with the effect that the course had on her and so attended one himself that 31 December. The pair's relationship culminated on 21 September 2008 in Assisi when they were married at the San Pietro church with D'Amato presiding over the liturgy. The couple had travelled to Assisi on a walking pilgrimage in 2008 and became engaged at the end of the walk on 2 August; Enrico had proposed to her three times and each time she accepted.

One month after their wedding the pair learnt that Chiara, newly enrolled for a postgraduate degree in political sciences, was pregnant. The first ultrasound scan revealed that their child, a daughter, had anencephaly and the parents were asked if they wished to abort. Enrico and Chiara both refused to do this and remained firmly focused on having the child.

The couple's first child, Maria Grazia Letizia, was born on 10 June 2009 but died after half an hour, long enough for Father D'Amato to baptize her; the baby's funeral was held on 12 June at the Sant'Angelo in Pescheria church. When a second pregnancy occurred, the initial ultrasound revealed that the child, a boy, had no legs but the couple were once more determined to have the child. The seventh month scans showed the child had visceral malformations with the absence of his lower limbs as a confirmation of the first scan. Further scans indicated that the second child had no kidneys and therefore his lungs would not be able to develop, which would lead to breathing complications. Despite this, the couple persevered and Davide Giovanni was born on 24 June 2010. Enrico carried his son to the hospital morgue after his son died after living for 38 minutes. His funeral was celebrated on 26 June in the Sant'Angelo in Pescheria church. Subsequently the pair soon became popular speakers at a range of pro-life events where they were able to share testimonies about the births of their two children. Both also recited the rosary each Thursday night and ended their prayer of consecration to the Blessed Mother with the words "Totus Tuus" ("yours entirely", the motto of Pope John Paul II, addressed to the Virgin Mary).

It was not long before Chiara became pregnant with her final child and the couple were relieved that the ultrasound scans demonstrated the child would be born in perfect health. However, in the fifth month Chiara became diagnosed with a bad lesion on the tongue and had to undergo a surgical procedure. Doctors informed her that the lesion had in fact been a carcinoma, but she was insistent on bearing her final child even if it meant endangering her life.

Chiara had an operation in March 2011 to treat her condition. Her final child, Francesco, was born at 37 weeks on 30 May 2011 in perfect health and her treatment started after his birth; she had another operation on 3 June. But the cancer's intensification over time meant that it became difficult for her to see and to speak. In March 2012 the pair brought their son to the Portiuncula church in Assisi in order to entrust him to the Blessed Mother. In late March Chiara learnt that the cancer had metastasized to one breast and to her liver, in addition to her lungs and one eye. Her condition was deemed terminal and the diagnosis was communicated to Enrico, who told his wife the news in the hospital chapel before the Blessed Sacrament. This was on 4 April, during Holy Week, and the two there and then renewed their marriage vows. Chiara met Pope Benedict XVI alongside her husband and son on 2 May 2012 at the pope's general audience, where the couple were able to discuss their experiences with the pope.

Chiara died at her home at noon on 13 June 2012, dressed in her wedding gown; she had participated in her final Mass on 12 June. Cardinal Agostino Vallini presided over her funeral Mass on 16 June at Santa Francesca Romana where he remembered her as "the second Gianna Beretta." Her remains are interred with those of her two children at the Campo Verano cemetery in Rome.

== Cause of beatification ==
The beatification process was opened in Rome on 2 July 2018 after Cardinal Angelo De Donatis issued an edict that established the cause would be introduced in Rome and also naming Corbella as a Servant of God. Cardinal De Donatis presided over the opening of the diocesan process on 21 September 2018 in the Basilica of Saint John Lateran and hoped that Christians would "find in her encouragement and support in the service of conjugal love and life". The postulator appointed for this cause is Romano Gambalunga OCD.
