= Valori plastici =

Cultural magazine in Italy (1918–1922)

- Editor: Mario Broglio
- Categories: Cultural magazine
- Founder: Mario Broglio; Edita Broglio
- Founded: 1918
- Final issue: 1922
- Country: Italy
- Based in: Rome
- Language: Italian; French

Valori plastici (Italian: Plastic Values) was an Italian magazine published in Rome in Italian and French. The magazine existed between 1918 and 1922.

== History and profile ==
Valori plastici was established in Rome by the painter and art collector Mario Broglio and his wife Edita Broglio in 1918. He also edited the magazine which focused on aesthetic ideals and metaphysical artwork. The magazine was modeled on the Bologna-based magazine La Raccolta. It supported the art movement return to order so as to create a change of direction from the extreme avant-garde art of the years up to 1918, taking its inspiration from traditional art instead.

The term "return to order" to describe this renewed interest in tradition is said to derive from Le rappel a l'ordre, a book of essays by the poet and artist Jean Cocteau published in 1926. The movement itself was a reaction to the First World War. Cubism was abandoned even by its creators, Braque and Picasso, and Futurism, which had praised machinery, violence and war, was rejected by most of its followers. The return to order was associated with a revival of classicism and realistic painting.

The magazine theorised the retrieval of national and Italic values, as promoted by the cultural policies of fascism, but also looking at wider horizons within Europe and using a vivid artistic dialectics with a return to a classic figurative source.

Alberto Savinio, in the 1st issue of Valori plastici on 15 November 1918, announced a programme of total individualistic, anti-futurist and anti-Bolshevik restoration. In his first article of April–May 1919, entitled Anadioménon, Savinio expounds the intellective and enigmatically atemporal intuition which animates the world of this new "metaphysical classicism". Ardengo Soffici's book Primi principi di una estetica futurista (Italian: First principles of a futurist aesthetic) was serialized in the November-December 1919 issue of the magazine before its publication by the publishing house Vallecchi in 1920.

Valori plastici ceased publication in 1922.

== See also ==
- List of magazines in Italy
- Return to order
- Scuola Romana
- Novecento Italiano
- Corrente di Vita
- Decadent movement

== Bibliography ==
- Italy's Radical Return to Order, on The New York Times (26 December 1998)
- (in Italian) Il Ritorno all'Ordine, on Fotoartearchitettura.it, article by P. Campanella (2010)
- (in Italian) F. Negri Arnoldi, Storia dell'arte, Fratelli Fabbri, Milan (1989)
- (in Italian) R. De Fusco, Storia dell'arte contemporanea, Laterza, Bari (1983)
- (in Italian) G.C. Argan, L'arte moderna, Sansoni, Florence (1970)
