= La Raccolta =

Monthly literary magazine in Kingdom of Italy (1918–1919)

- Editor-in-chief: Giuseppe Raimondi
- Categories: Literary magazine
- Frequency: Monthly
- Publisher: Strada Maggiore
- Founder: Giuseppe Raimondi; Riccardo Bacchelli
- Founded: 1918
- First issue: 15 March 1918
- Final issue Number: 15 February 1919; 11–12
- Country: Kingdom of Italy
- Based in: Bologna
- Language: Italian

La Raccolta (Italian: The Collection) was a monthly literary magazine which was published in Bologna, Italy, between March 1918 and February 1919. It was one of the significant platforms for the discussions about the development of a new approach towards Italian literary movements in the country during its run.

== History and profile ==
La Raccolta was first published in Bologna on 15 March 1918. Its publisher was Strada Maggiore. The magazine came out monthly and was edited by Giuseppe Raimondi who cofounded it with Riccardo Bacchelli. Regular contributors of the magazine included Riccardo Bacchelli, Vincenzo Cardarelli, Lorenzo Montano, and Aurelio Saffi. The magazine featured drawings and writings of Caravaggio, Giorgio de Chirico, Giorgio Morandi, and Ardengo Soffici. Soffici's book Primi principi di una estetica futurista (Italian: First principles of a futurist aesthetic) was serialized in the magazine between June and August 1918 before its publication by the publishing house Vallecchi in 1920. The book was also serialized in other Italian magazines, including La Voce and Valori plastici.

La Raccolta aimed at reviving cultural activities immediately after World War I. The magazine opposed the dominant avant-garde perspective adopted in the pre-war Italy and attempted to develop a new approach towards Italian art based on the national tradition. It supported the art movement Return to order or the "Italian plastic renaissance" through the metaphysical artists of which the notable example was Caravaggio.

La Raccolta folded on 15 February 1919 with the publication of the double issue numbered 11–12. It would be a model for two magazines: Valori plastici and La Ronda.
