= Riccardo Bacchelli =

Italian writer (1891–1985)

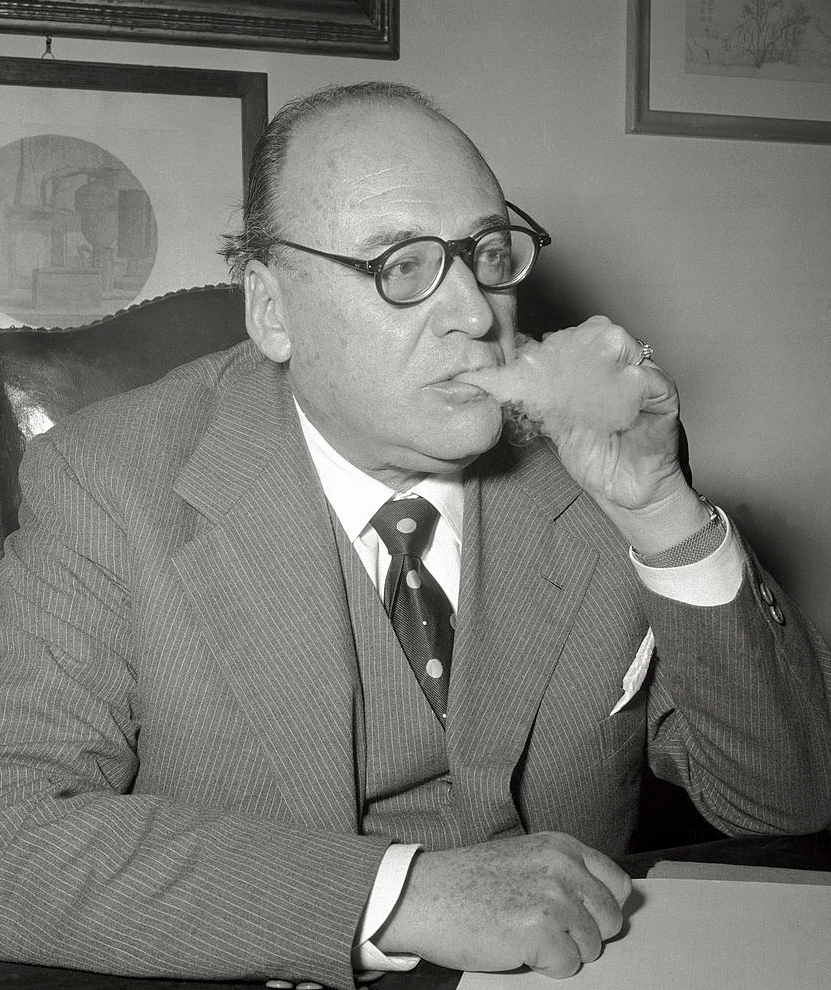
- Bacchelli c. 1955
- Born: 19 April 1891; Bologna, Italy
- Died: 8 October 1985 (aged 94); Monza, Italy
- Occupations: Novelist, playwright, essayist
- Writing career
- Genres: Novel, play, essay
- Notable work: Il mulino del Po

Riccardo Bacchelli (Italian pronunciation: [rikˈkardo bakˈkɛlli]; 19 April 1891 – 8 October 1985) was an Italian writer. In 1927 he was one of the founders of the review La Ronda and Bagutta Prize for literature. He was nominated for the Nobel Prize in Literature eight times.

== Biography ==
=== Early life and education ===
Born into a well-off liberal family in Bologna, he studied literature at university there under Pascoli, though he did not take his degree. He published his first novel, Il filo meraviglioso di Lodovico Clò, in 1911, and was already writing for La Voce and Il Resto del Carlino before World War I, in which he served as an artillery officer. Bacchelli contributed to the Bologna-based magazine La Raccolta from 1918 to 1919. He was a member of the editorial board of the Rome-based magazine La Ronda between 1919 and 1922.

=== Career ===
He wrote and published extensively during the 1920s, and was recognized as a major literary figure, becoming a member of the Royal Academy of Italy in 1941. The works for which he was most highly regarded were his historical novels, beginning with Lo sa il tonno (1923) and Il diavolo al Pontelungo (1927). These look back to Manzoni for their mixture of factuality and invention, though Bacchelli was constantly reshaping his style, bringing together popular, literary, and erudite strands in often distinctive combinations.

=== The works of maturity ===
His most popular work remains the three-volume Il mulino del Po (The Mill on the Po, 1938–1940), which covered a century in the life of a rural family from the Napoleonic era to World War I. A film adapted from the novel was released in 1949. Later novels, published from 1945 to 1978, include: Il pianto del figlio di Lais, Non ti chiamerò più padre, La cometa, Il rapporto segreto (The secret relationship), Afrodite: un romanzo d'amore (Aphrodite: a love novel), Il progresso è un razzo (Progress is a rocket) and Il sommergibile (The submarine).

In addition Bacchelli's creative work includes a large number of novelle (among them some fables), poetry, and plays. He also published various books of travel writing and critical essays on 19th-century Italian Italian literature and opera. He was awarded the Knight Grand Cross of the Order of Merit of the Italian Republic in 1971.

== Il mulino del Po ==
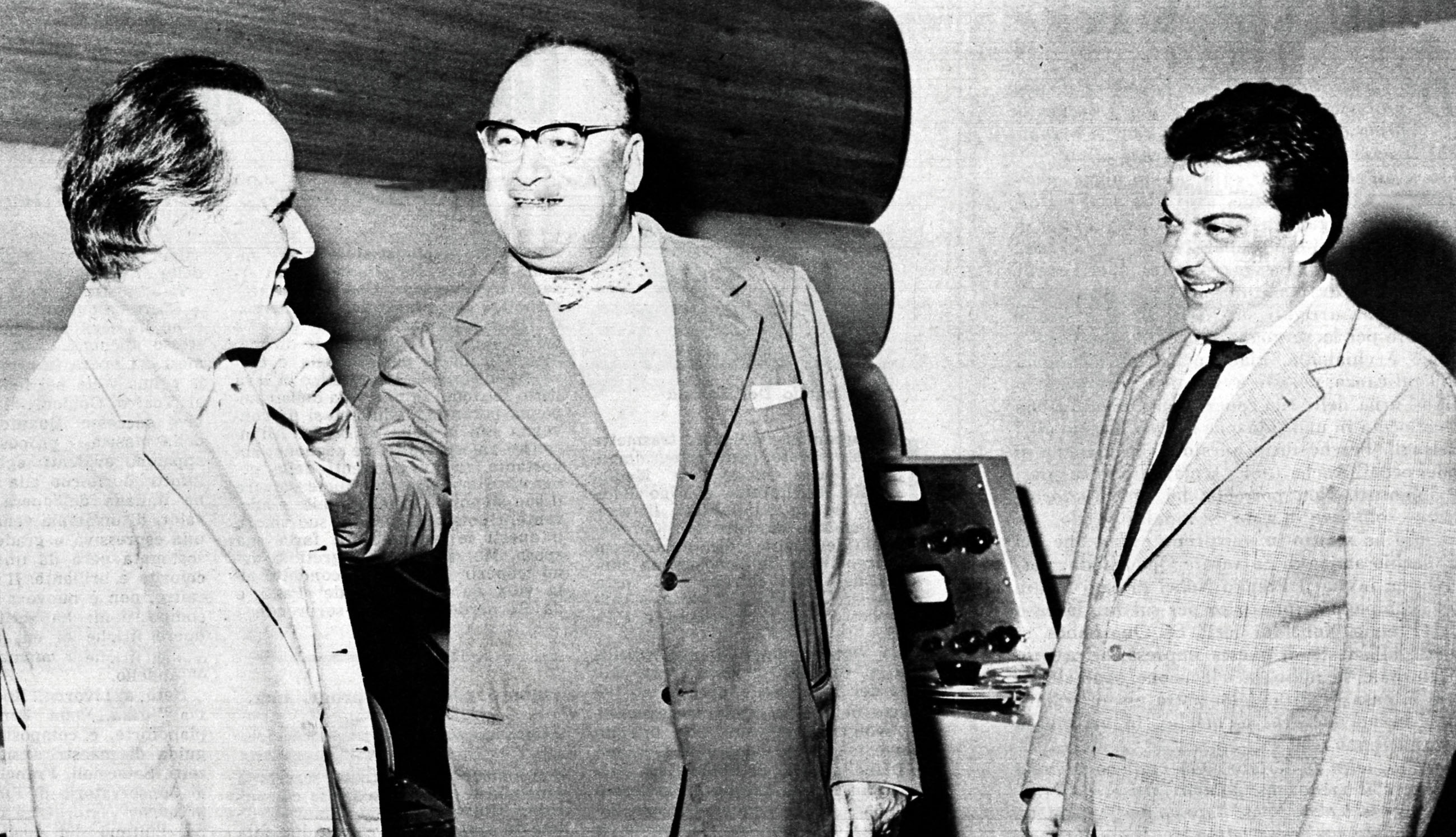
Bacchelli (center) with Nino Rota and Bruno Maderna in 1963

The novel narrates in more than 2000 pages the lives, adventures and problems of Lazzaro Scacerni and his family. It opens in the early nineteenth century as Scacerni returns to Italy from Russia, where he had served as a soldier in Napoleon's invasion, and follows him and his family through a full century until the First World War. Scacerni owns a mill in a rural area on the river Po (hence the title). He and his descendants conduct their lives amid political turmoil, wars, economic hardship, and class conflicts.

The historical, geographical and social background was painstakingly researched by Bacchelli, who created a large and comprehensive portrait of life in rural Italy in the nineteenth century. The language and style of this novel show that Bacchelli held Alessandro Manzoni as his model. At the same time, he created a structure that showed his attention to contemporary European novels.

== Honour ==
- Italy: Knight Grand Cross of the Order of Merit of the Italian Republic (19 April 1971)
