= Adelaide Ristori =

Italian actress (1822–1906)

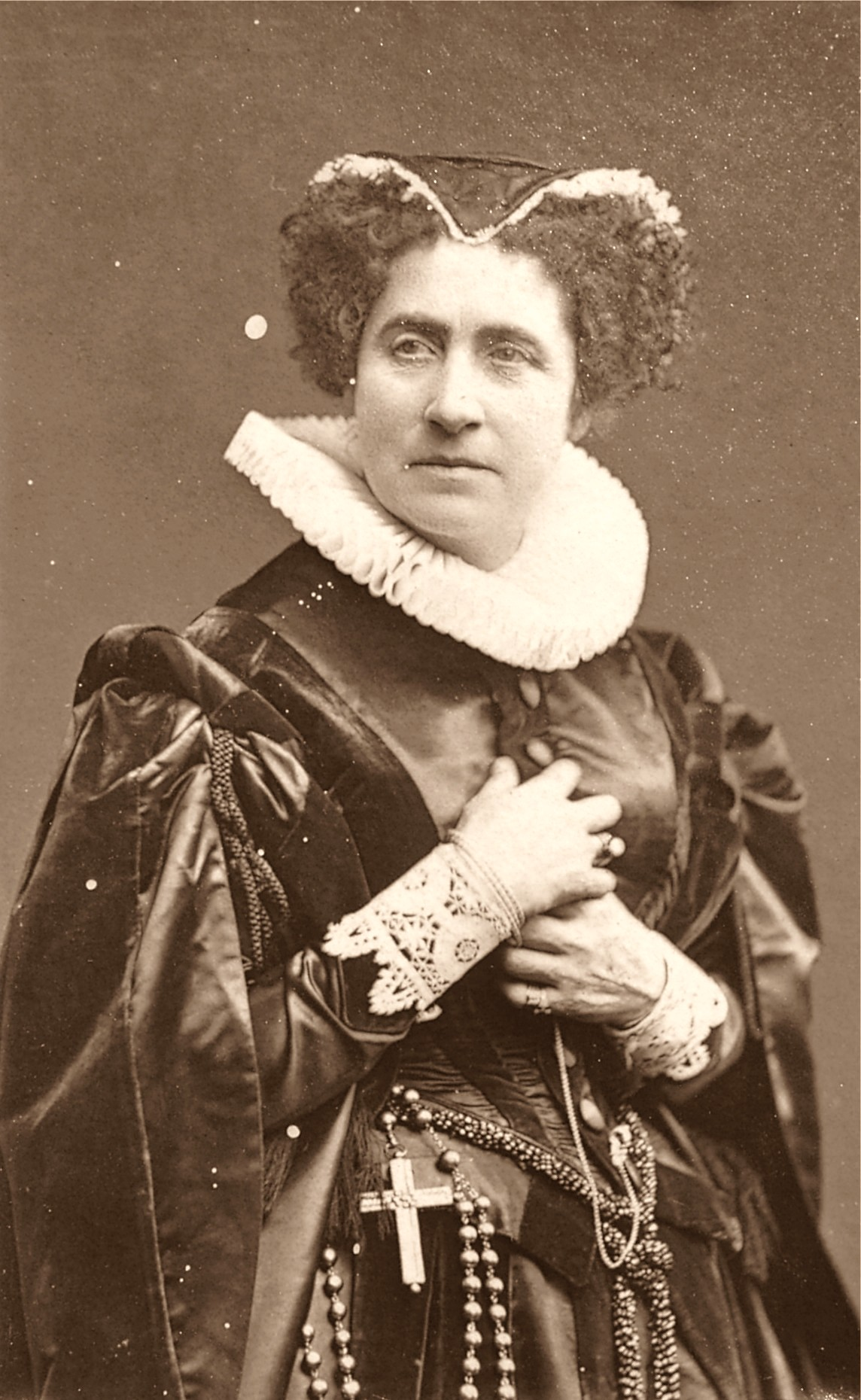
- Born: 29 January 1822; Cividale del Friuli, Italy
- Died: 9 October 1906 (aged 84); Turin, Italy
- Occupation: Actress
- Spouse: Giuliano Capranica, marchese del Grillo (m. 1846)
- Children: 2

Adelaide Ristori (29 January 1822 – 9 October 1906) was a distinguished Italian tragedienne, who was often referred to as the Marquise.

== Biography ==
She was born in Cividale del Friuli, the daughter of strolling players, and appeared as a child on the stage. At age fourteen, she made her first success as Francesca da Rimini in Silvio Pellico's tragedy of the same name. At eighteen she was playing Mary Stuart in an Italian version of Friedrich Schiller's play of the same name. She had been a member of the Sardinian company and also of the Ducal company at Parma for some years before her marriage to Giuliano Capranica, marchese del Grillo, in 1846. After a short retirement from her career, she returned to the stage and played regularly in Turin and the provinces.

It was not until 1855 that she paid her first professional visit to Paris, where the part of Francesca was chosen for her début. In this she was rather coldly received, but she took Paris by storm in the title role of Alfieri's Myrrha. Furious partisanship was aroused by the appearance of a rival to the great Rachel. Paris was divided into two camps of opinion. Humble playgoers fought at gallery doors over the merits of their respective favourites. The two famous women never actually met, but the French actress seems to have been convinced that Ristori had no ill feelings towards her, only admiration and respect.

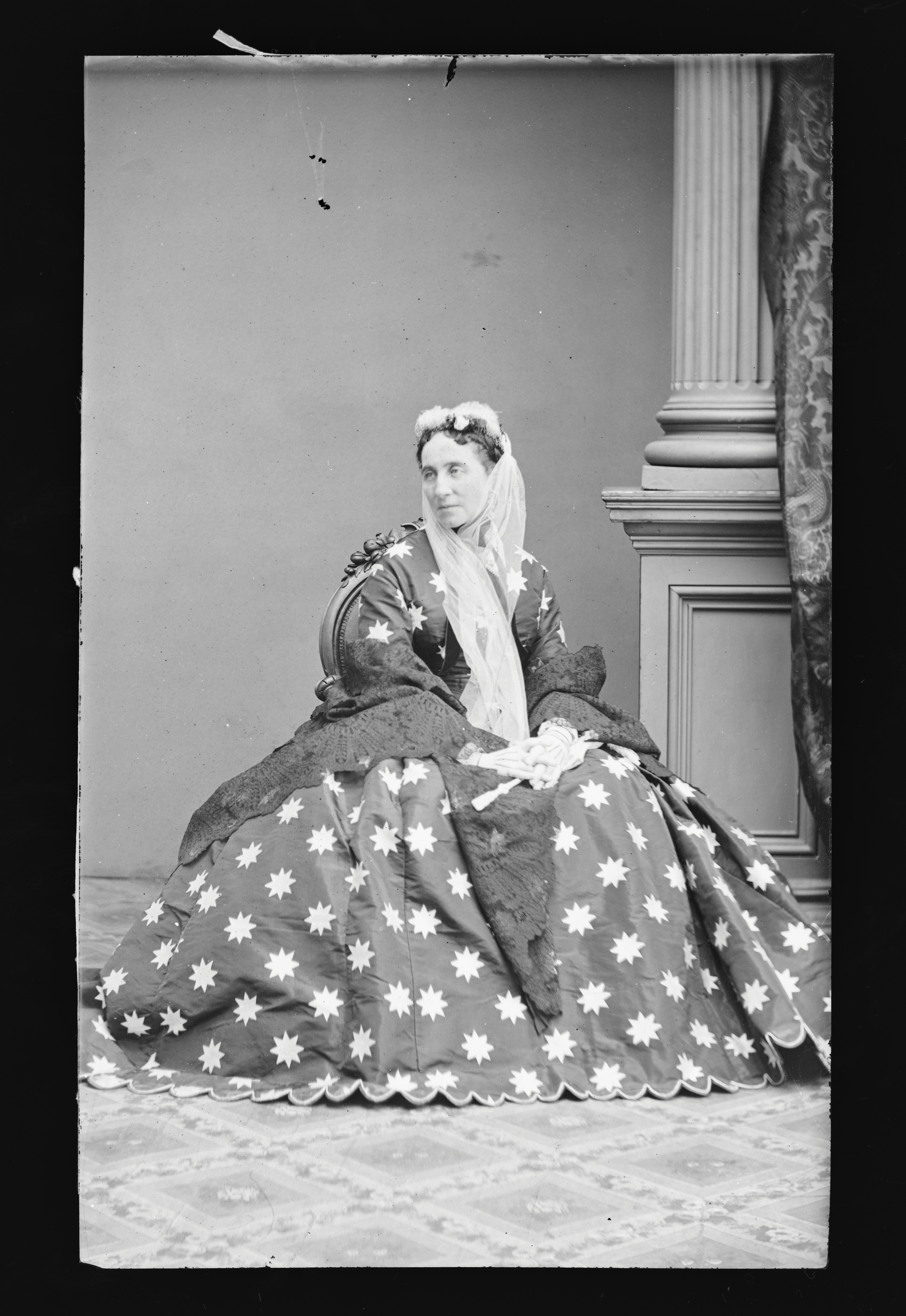
Photograph of Adelaide Ristori, 1860s

A tour in other countries was followed (1856) by a fresh visit to Paris, when Ristori appeared in Montanelli's Italian translation of Ernest Legouvé's Medea. She repeated her success in this in London. In 1857, she visited Madrid, playing in Spanish to enthusiastic audiences, and in 1866 she paid the first of four visits to the United States, where she won much applause, particularly in Paolo Giacometti's Elisabeth, an Italian study of the English sovereign. In a letter to The Daily Alta California, humorist Mark Twain attributed Ristori's popularity in America in this later phase of her career to "determined newspapers and shrewd managers".

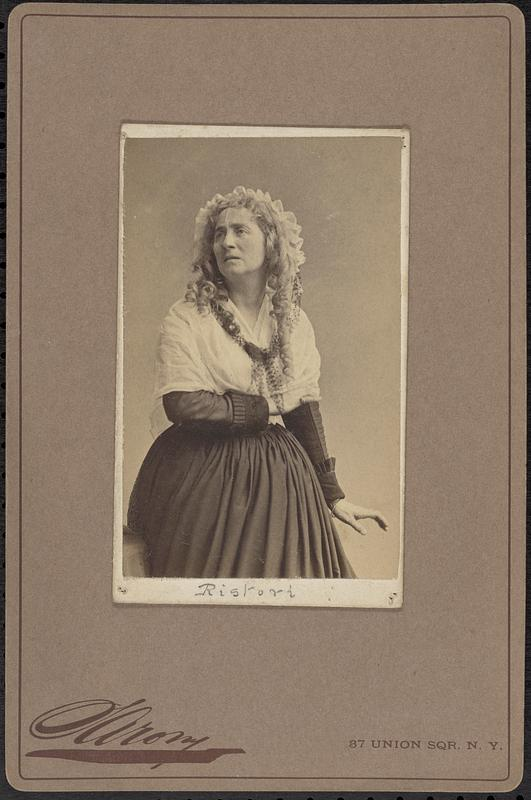
Adelaide Ristori in costume as Marie Antoinette, a role she played starting in 1867, ca. 1867-1885; from the Cabinet Card Collection of the Boston Public Library

In 1875, after one of the United States visits, she toured to Australia, performing the roles of Medea, Mary Stuart, and the title role in Elizabeth, Queen of England, written especially for her by Paolo Giacometti. Ristori's niece Giulia Tessero and the latter's husband, Eduardo Majeroni, joined Ristori's world tour, later settling in Australia and working as actors and theatre managers.

Of her 1878 tour to Spain, Ristori said, "[It] was not a great pleasure to me, because I already knew the country; and also, with the exception of Madrid and Barcelona, which are still flourishing, I found all the towns much changed in every way, politically and otherwise, for the worse", but a tour to Scandinavia the following year, "on the contrary, was a great delight to me—the seeing [of] entirely new and charming countries, and the making [of] acquaintances with a most enthusiastic public, who lauded me to the seventh heaven!"

Eleanor Marx wrote to her sister Jenny telling her that she was to see Ristori perform Lady Macbeth “for the first time in English” in London on 4 July 1882.

In Victoria, Australia, a company working several gold mines on the rich Berry Lead near Allendale was named Ristori after her, which led to a part of Allendale being known as Ristori town:

"...the villages of Allendale (with its suburbs, Ristori Town and Broomfield)...the Ristori group owed their names to the original Adelaide Ristori, the Italian actress."

She retired from professional life in 1885, and died on 9 October 1906 in Rome. She left a son, the marchese Giorgio Capranica del Grillo, and a daughter, Bianca Capranica (aka Bianca Ristori)

In 2022, on the occasion of the bicentenary of Ristori, the Museo Biblioteca dell'Attore of Genoa (which owns the Ristori legacy) organized a series of celebrations with the National Theater of Genoa, the University and the Municipality of Genoa, including one theatrical show with Lady Macbeth from Ristori directed by David Livermore, an exhibition of Ristori costumes at Palazzo Lomellino (Palazzo dei Rolli) and an international university conference on the actress to be held at the University of Genoa and Milan. This celebration has become one of the two UNESCO events entrusted to Italy for 22-23, the other being the centenary of Pasolini.

== On the stage ==
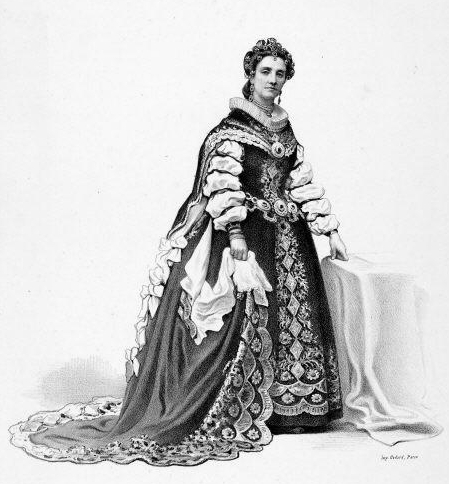
As Elizabeth in Paolo Giacometti's Elisabetha regina d'Inghilterra

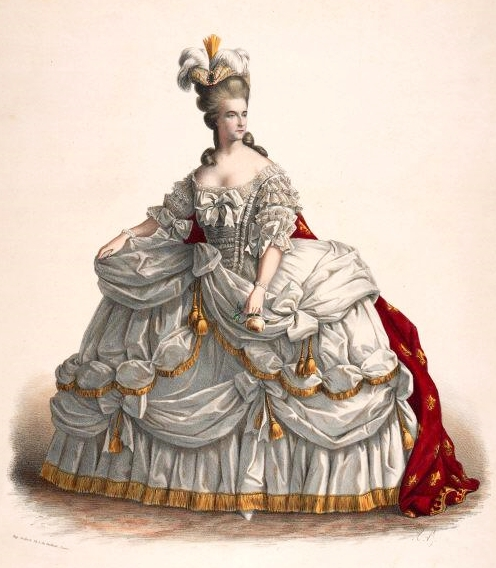
As Marie Antoinette in Paolo Giacometti's Maria Antonietta

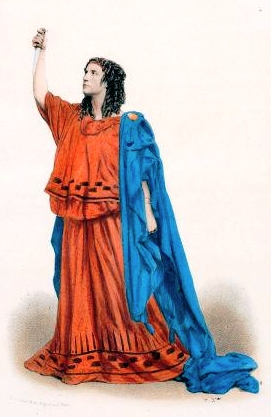
As Medea in Ernest Legouvé's Médée

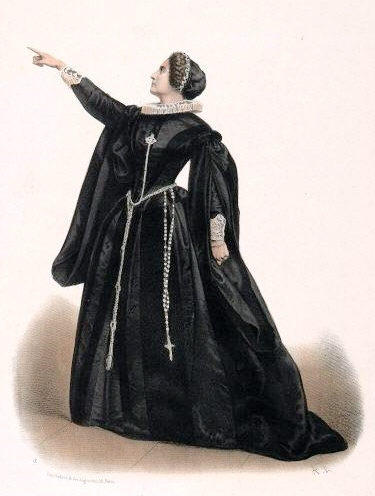
As Mary Stuart in Friedrich Schiller's Maria Stuart

== Studies and Memoirs ==
Her publication, Studies and Memoirs (1888), provides a lively account of an interesting career, and is particularly valuable for the chapters devoted to the psychological explanation of the characters of Mary Stuart, Elizabeth, Myrrha, Phaedra and Lady Macbeth, in her interpretation of which, Ristori combined high dramatic instinct with the keenest and most critical intellectual study. A review by Oscar Wilde stated that

Madame Ristori's Etudes et Souvenirs is one of the most delightful books on the stage that has appeared since Lady Martin's charming volume on the Shakespearian heroines.
