= General Cathcart =

General Cathcart may refer to:

- Alan Cathcart, 6th Earl Cathcart (1919–1999), British Army major general
- Charles Cathcart, 2nd Earl Cathcart (1783–1859), British Army general
- Charles Cathcart, 8th Lord Cathcart (1686–1740), British Army major general
- Charles Cathcart, 9th Lord Cathcart (1721–1776), British Army lieutenant general
- George Cathcart (1794–1854), British Army major general
- William Cathcart, 1st Earl Cathcart (1755–1843), British Army general
