= Charles Cathcart =

Charles Cathcart may refer to:

- Charles Cathcart, 8th Lord Cathcart (1686–1740), British Army officer
- Charles Cathcart, 9th Lord Cathcart (1721–1776), British soldier and diplomat
- Charles Cathcart, 2nd Earl Cathcart (1783–1859), British Army general and Governor General of the Province of Canada
- Charles Cathcart, 7th Earl Cathcart (born 1952), British peer and member of the House of Lords
- Charles Allan Cathcart (1759–1788), British soldier and MP, son of the 9th Lord Cathcart
- Charles W. Cathcart (1809–1888), United States Representative and Senator from Indiana
- Charles Walker Cathcart (1853–1932), Scottish surgeon and rugby union player
