= George Cathcart, 5th Earl Cathcart =

Lieutenant The Right Honourable The Earl Cathcart
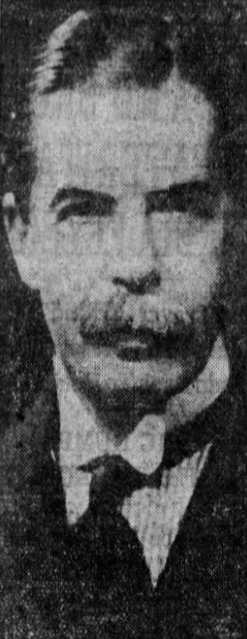
- Cathcart (c. 1927)
- Born: George Cathcart; 26 June 1862
- Died: 19 November 1927 (aged 65); London, England
- Spouse: Vera Fraser Warter (m. 1919; div. 1922)
- Children: Alan Cathcart, 6th Earl Cathcart
- Parent(s): Alan Cathcart, 3rd Earl Cathcart; Elizabeth Mary Crompton
- Relatives: Charles Cathcart, 2nd Earl Cathcart (grandfather); Sir Samuel Crompton, 1st Baronet (grandfather)

George Cathcart, 5th Earl Cathcart (26 June 1862 – 19 November 1927), styled Lord Greenock until 1911, was a British Army officer and peer.

== Early life ==
Cathcart was born on 26 June 1862. He was third of five sons born to Alan Cathcart, 3rd Earl Cathcart and the former Elizabeth Mary Crompton (1831–1902). His two elder brothers were Alan Cathcart, 4th Earl Cathcart and Lt. Hon. Charles Cathcart (who both died unmarried). His younger brothers were Capt. Hon. Reginald Cathcart (who served in the Second Boer War and was killed at the Relief of Ladysmith in South Africa) and the Hon. Archibald Cathcart. Among his sisters were Lady Cecilia Cathcart (wife of Capt. Edward Temple Rose), Lady Ida Cathcart (wife of Sir Thomas Hare, 1st Baronet), Lady Marion Cathcart, Lady Emily Cathcart, and Lady Eva Cathcart.

His mother was the eldest daughter and heiress of Sir Samuel Crompton, 1st Baronet. His paternal grandparents were the former Henrietta Mather (second daughter of Thomas Mather) and Charles Cathcart, 2nd Earl Cathcart, a British Army general who became Governor General of the Province of Canada and was Commander-in-Chief, Scotland and North America.

== Career ==
Upon his eldest brother's death on 2 September 1911, he succeeded to the earldom of Cathcart.

Cathcart was a Lieutenant in the 4th Battalion, Yorkshire Regiment (Alexandra, Princess of Wales's Own).

== Personal life ==
On 6 January 1919, the fifty-six year old Lord Cathcart married Vera Estelle (née Fraser) Warter (d. 1993) at Holy Trinity Church in Chelsea, London. Vera, the widow of Capt. Henry de Grey Warter of Cruckmeole in Shropshire (who was killed in the Battle of the Somme in France), (Note: From Vera's first marriage to Capt. Henry de Grey Warter (a son of Henry de Grey Warter), she was the mother of Dolores Warter (who married Theodore Medlam in 1929) and Henry de Gray Warter (who married "musical comedy star" Mabel Bowers Rean in 1930).) was a daughter of John Fraser of Cape Town, South Africa. "She was thirty-odd years his junior and their marriage proved a mistake almost from the start. In 1921 the Earl advertised that he would no longer be responsible for her debts and in the next year he obtained a divorce, naming the Earl of Craven." Before their divorce, (Note: Eighteen months after the Cathcart's divorce, the Countess eloped to South Africa with Lord Craven. In 1926, Lord Craven and Lady Cathcart were again the centre of controversy when arriving to the United States. "While the Countess was held at Ellis Island, a writ for his arrest was issued, but he departed for Canada in time to prevent its being served. His wife joined him in Canada, and they left together for Berumda," with Lord Craven denying he was ever "guilty of any moral turpitude".) they were the parents of one son:

- Alan Cathcart, 6th Earl Cathcart (1919–1999), who married twice, including to Marie Cathcart, Countess Cathcart.

Lord Cathcart died in a London nursing home on 19 November 1927 following an operation, and was succeeded by his son, Alan. After his death, Lady Cathcart married the wealthy shipping magnate Sir Rowland Hodge, 1st Baronet on 30 September 1930.

Peerage of the United Kingdom
| Preceded by Alan Cathcart | Earl Cathcart; 1911–1927 | Succeeded by Alan Cathcart |
