= Alan Cathcart =

Alan Cathcart may refer to:

- Alan Cathcart, 4th Lord Cathcart (1537–1618), Scottish peer and military officer
- Alan Cathcart, 3rd Earl Cathcart (1828–1905), landowner and writer on agriculture
- Alan Cathcart, 6th Earl Cathcart (1919–1999), British Army officer
