= Vera Cathcart, Countess Cathcart =

Vera Estelle Cathcart, Countess Cathcart (14 May 1892 – April 1993) was a South African writer and actress. She wrote the play Ashes of Love, which was staged in London, Washington, D.C., and New York City where she succeeded Earl Carroll as the producer of the show. She wrote other plays and several novels, including The Woman Tempted.

== Biography ==
Vera Estelle Raubenheimer was born 14 May 1892 at Cape Town, Cape Colony, the daughter of Anthony Raubenheimer of Cape Town. In 1929, Vera told the New York Times that she had been married in 1908. After that, she went by the name Vera Fraser.

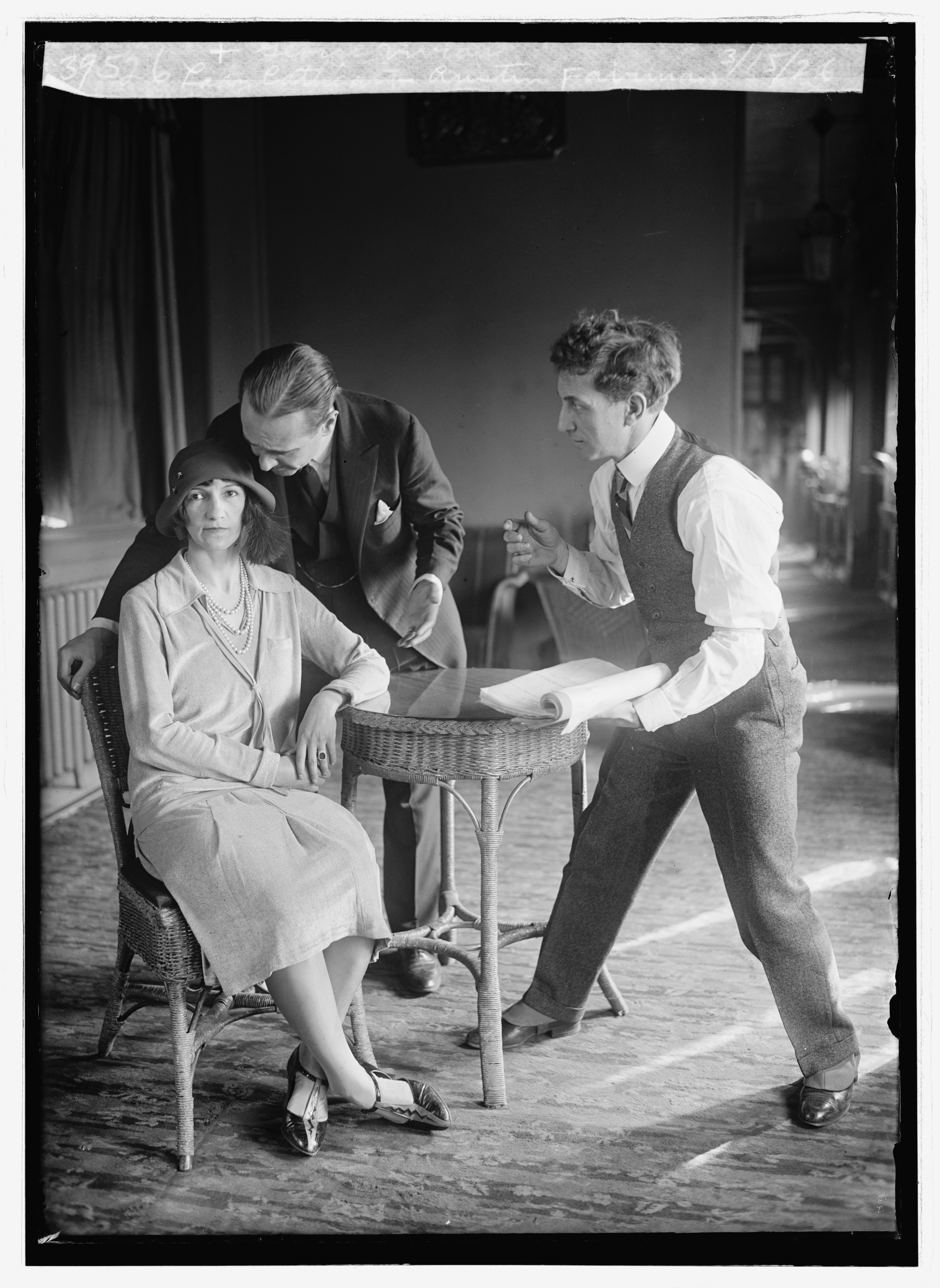

In September 1910, Vera married Captain Henry de Grey Warter (1885–1917) of Cruckmeole in Shropshire. Before he was killed in battle in World War I, they had two children:

- Dolores de Gray Warter, who was engaged to Theodore Medlam in 1929; she married Gerald Holdsworth.
- Henry Grosvenor de Gray Warter (1911–1993), who married "musical comedy star" Mabel Bowers Rean in 1930.

Vera then married George Cathcart, 5th Earl Cathcart, a younger son of Alan Cathcart, 3rd Earl Cathcart and Elizabeth Mary Crompton, on 6 January 1919 in Chelsea, London. They were divorced in 1922, after Cathcart accused Vera of having committed adultery. They had one son:

- Alan Cathcart, 6th Earl Cathcart (1919–1999), a Maj.-Gen. in the British Army who married Rosemary Clare Marie Gabrielle Smyth-Osbourne, daughter of A/Cdre Sir Henry Percy Smyth-Osbourne, in 1946. After her death, he married Marie Isobel French, daughter of Hon. William Joseph French (himself a son of the 4th Baron de Freyne), in 1984.

Vera's third marriage was to widower and shipbuilding millionaire Sir Rowland Hodge, 1st Baronet on 30 September 1930. Four years after their marriage, Lady Hodge sought a divorce from Sir Rowland but was denied by the court and jury in November 1934.

Lady Hodge died in April 1993.
