= Clan Cathcart =

Lowland Scottish clan

- Crest: A dexter hand couped above the wrist and erect Proper, grasping a crescent Argent
- Motto: I hope to speed

Chief
- Charles Alan Andrew Cathcart
- the 7th Earl Cathcart
- Seat: Gateley Hall
- Historic seat: Cathcart Castle

Clan Cathcart is a Lowland Scottish clan.

== History ==
=== Origins of the Clan ===
The lands of Cathcart are named after the River Cart in Renfrewshire. Caeth-cart means the strait of Cart. Rainaldus de Kethcart appears to have been the progenitor of the family. In 1178 he was witness to a charter of the king's steward to Paisley Abbey. His son was William de Kethcart who was a witness to a charter in about 1200, exchanging the lands of Knoc near Walkinshaw with the Abbey of Paisley. In 1234 a charter of resignation of the lands of Culbeth to the Abbot of Paisley was sealed by Alan de Cathcart.

=== Wars of Scottish Independence ===
Clan Cathcart land, south of Glasgow.

Alan de Cathcart's son, William de Cathcart, was one of the Scottish barons who submitted to Edward I of England and is listed on the Ragman Rolls of 1296. William was succeeded by Alan de Cathcart who was a staunch supporter of king Robert the Bruce in cause of Scottish independence. He followed the king's brother, Edward Bruce and was among a party of just fifty knights who surprised a much superior English force under Lord St John in Galloway and routed them. Alan survived the Wars of Scottish Independence and is recorded in a deed making a gift to the Dominican Friars of Glasgow in 1336. In the deed he is designated as Dominus Ejusdem which is translated as of that Ilk. Alan was related to the Bruces through his wife who was the sister of Sir Duncan Wallace of Sundram, husband of Elanor Bruce, the Countess of Carrick.

=== 15th and 16th centuries ===
Sir Alan de Cathcart obtained several estates in Carrick. He was raised to the peerage with the title Lord Cathcart in 1447. He also obtained lands in Ayrshire including the estate of Auchencruive which was the family seat until 1718. Alan became constable of the royal Dundonald Castle. In 1485 he was appointed as Master of the Artillery.

Alan Cathcart, son of the second Lord Cathcart was killed along with his two half-brothers, Robert and John, in 1513 at the Battle of Flodden. The third Lord Cathcart was killed at the Battle of Pinkie Cleugh in 1547.

Alan Cathcart the fourth Lord Cathcart was a Protestant and a promoter of the Scottish Reformation. He and his men fought for the Regent Moray at the Battle of Langside in 1568 against the army of Mary, Queen of Scots. The ancient Cathcart Castle has a view point and is near the battlefield, from which the queen is said to have awaited the outcome of the battle.

=== 18th century ===
==== Jacobite rising of 1715 ====
Charles Cathcart, 8th Lord Cathcart was born in about 1686 and had a distinguished military career. He became a major on the Scots Grays in 1709. During the Jacobite rising of 1715 the eighth Lord Cathcart commanded a detachment of dragoons and it was Cathcart's troops that outflanked the Jacobite forces at Battle of Sheriffmuir. Cathcart had also previously defeated the Jacobites at the Skirmish of Dunfermline in October 1715.

==== Jacobite rising of 1745 ====
Charles Cathcart, 9th Lord Cathcart was an aide-de-camp to the Duke of Cumberland and fought for the government at the Battle of Culloden in 1746 where he was wounded. In 1768 he was appointed ambassador at Saint Petersburg and he was well received by Empress Catherine. He wore a patch on his cheek which was apparently to hide a wound that was received at the Battle of Fontenoy.

=== Napoleonic Wars ===
William Cathcart, the tenth Lord Cathcart accompanied his father to Russia. When he returned to Scotland he took up legal studies and was called to the Bar in 1776. When he succeeded his fathers title he gave up legal studies and returned to the army. He rose to the rank of lieutenant general and was commander in chief of the forces in Ireland. He was also created a Knight of the Thistle.

During the Napoleonic Wars in 1807 as Napoleon's troops were about to take control of Denmark, Lord Cathcart and Admiral Gambier successfully besieged Copenhagen and captured the Danish fleet of over 60 vessels together with naval stores and munitions. Lord Cathcart was rewarded with the titles Viscount Cathcart and Baron of Greenock. In June 1814 he was made Earl Cathcart.

The second Earl Cathcart also had a distinguished military career and served throughout the Peninsular War, fighting at the Battle of Waterloo in 1815. He was also the commander of the British Army in Scotland and governor of Edinburgh Castle from 1837 to 1842.

== Chief ==
Clan Chief: The Rt. Hon. Charles Alan Andrew Cathcart of Cathcart, the 7th Earl Cathcart, Viscount Cathcart of Cathcart, Lord Cathcart and Baron Greenock of Greenock, Chief of the Name and Arms of Cathcart.

== Castles ==
- Cathcart Castle was the seat of the Earl Cathcart, chief of Clan Cathcart.
- Carleton Castle

== See also ==
- Scottish clan
- Cathcart
