= Earl Cathcart =

Earldom in the Peerage of the United Kingdom

Earl Cathcart Chief of Clan Cathcart
- Blazon Arms: Azure, three Crosses-Crosslet fitchée, issuing from three Crescents Argent. Crest: A dexter Hand couped above the wrist and erect proper, grasping a Crescent Argent. Supporters: On either side a Parrot, wings inverted proper.
- Creation date: 16 July 1814
- Created by: The Prince Regent (acting on behalf of his father King George III)
- Peerage: Peerage of the United Kingdom
- First holder: William Cathcart, 1st Earl Cathcart
- Present holder: Charles Cathcart, 7th Earl Cathcart
- Heir apparent: Alan Cathcart, Lord Greenock
- Subsidiary titles: Viscount Cathcart; Lord Cathcart; Baron Greenock
- Status: Extant
- Motto: I HOPE TO SPEED

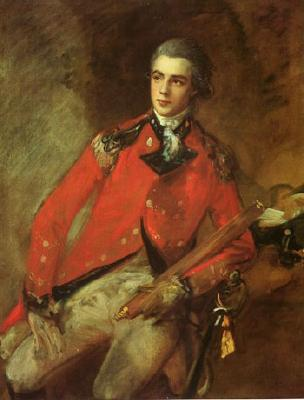
A young William Cathcart, 1st Earl Cathcart

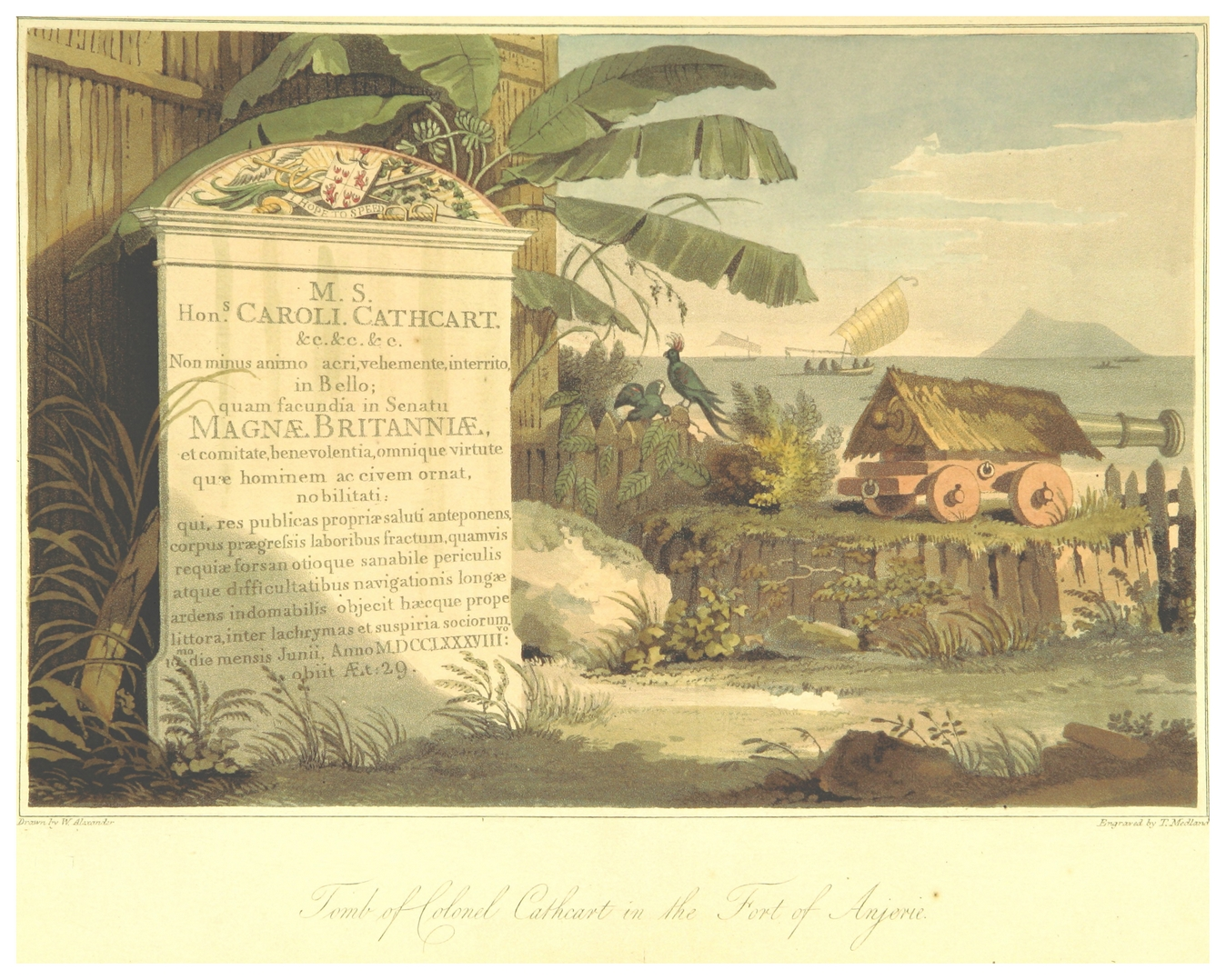
The tombstone of Colonel Charles Cathcart, ambassador to China and younger brother of the first Earl, who died on his ship and was buried at a Dutch outpost in the Sunda Strait.

Earl Cathcart is a title in the Peerage of the United Kingdom.

== History ==
The title was created in 1814 for the soldier and diplomat William Cathcart, 1st Viscount Cathcart. The Cathcart family descends from Sir Alan Cathcart, who sometime between 1447 and 1460 was raised to the Peerage of Scotland as Lord Cathcart. He later served as Warden of the West Marches and Master of the Artillery. His great-great-grandson, the third Lord, was killed at the Battle of Pinkie in 1547 (his father Alan Cathcart, Master of Cathcart, was one of many Scottish noblemen killed at the Battle of Flodden in 1513). He was succeeded by his son, the fourth Lord. He fought at the Battle of Langside in 1568 and was Master of the Household to King James VI. His great-great-great-grandson, the eighth Lord, was a soldier. He was a major-general in the army and sat in the House of Lords as a Scottish representative peer from 1734 to 1740. In 1740, Lord Cathcart was appointed commander-in-chief of the British Forces in America. However, he died on the passage out and was buried on Dominica.

He was succeeded by his son, the ninth Lord. He was a lieutenant-general in the army and also served as British Ambassador to Russia. Between 1752 and 1776, Lord Cathcart sat in the House of Lords as a Scottish Representative Peer. His son, the tenth Lord, was a noted military commander and diplomat. He was a general in the army and like his father served as British Ambassador to Russia. From 1788 to 1812, Lord Cathcart was a Scottish Representative Peer in the House of Lords. In 1807, he was created Baron Greenock, of Greenock in the County of Renfrew, and Viscount Cathcart, of Cathcart in the County of Renfrew, and in 1814 he was made Earl Cathcart. These titles were in the Peerage of the United Kingdom.

He was succeeded by his second but eldest surviving son, the second Earl. Like his father he was a general in the army and also served as Governor General of Canada from 1846 to 1847. On his death the titles passed to his second but eldest surviving son, the third Earl. He was a Deputy Lieutenant of the North Riding of Yorkshire and President of the Royal Agricultural Society. His eldest son, the fourth Earl, was also a Deputy Lieutenant of the North Riding of Yorkshire. He never married and was succeeded by his younger brother, the fifth Earl. His son, the sixth Earl, was a major-general in the army and served as a Deputy Speaker of the House of Lords from 1976 to 1989. The titles are held by the latter's only son, the seventh Earl, who succeeded in 1999. He is one of the ninety elected hereditary peers that remain in the House of Lords after the passing of the House of Lords Act 1999, and sits on the Conservative benches. Lord Cathcart lost his seat in 1999 but was able to return in 2007 in a by-election caused by the death of Lord Mowbray. He is also chief of Clan Cathcart.

Several other members of the family may also be mentioned. The Hon. Sir George Cathcart, fourth son of the first Earl, was a general in the army. The Hon. Charles Cathcart, younger son of the ninth Lord, was a colonel in the British Army and represented Clackmannanshire in the House of Commons. The Hon. Louisa Cathcart, daughter of the ninth Lord, married David Murray, 7th Viscount of Stormont. In 1793, on the death of her and Lord Stormont's uncle William Murray, 1st Earl of Mansfield and Mansfield, Louisa inherited (under a special remainder in the letters patent) the earldom of Mansfield created in 1776, and became the second Countess of Mansfield, while her husband inherited the earldom of Mansfield created in 1792, and became the second Earl of Mansfield (see the Earl of Mansfield and Mansfield for later history of these titles).

The family seat is Gateley Hall, near Fakenham, Norfolk.

== Lords Cathcart (1460) ==
- Alan Cathcart, 1st Lord Cathcart (died 1497), Master of Artillery to James IV.
  - Alan Cathcart, Master of Cathcart (died before 1497)
- John Cathcart, 2nd Lord Cathcart (died 1535)
  - Alan Cathcart, Master of Cathcart (died 1513)
- Alan Cathcart, 3rd Lord Cathcart (died 1547)
- Alan Cathcart, 4th Lord Cathcart (1537–1618)
  - Alan Cathcart, Master of Cathcart (1562–1602)
- Alan Cathcart, 5th Lord Cathcart (1600–1628)
- Alan Cathcart, 6th Lord Cathcart (1628–1709)
- Alan Cathcart, 7th Lord Cathcart (1648–1732)
  - Allan Cathcart (died 1699)
- Charles Cathcart, 8th Lord Cathcart (1686–1740)
  - George Alan Cathcart (born 1719)
  - John Cathcart (born 1719)
- Charles Schaw Cathcart, 9th Lord Cathcart (1721–1776)
- William Schaw Cathcart, 10th Lord Cathcart (1755–1843) (created Baron Greenock and Viscount Cathcart in 1807 and Earl Cathcart in 1814)

== Earls Cathcart (1814) ==
- William Schaw Cathcart, 1st Earl Cathcart (1755–1843)
  - William Cathcart, Master of Cathcart (1782–1804)
- Charles Murray Cathcart, 2nd Earl Cathcart (1783–1859)
  - Hon. Charles Cathcart (1824–1825)
- Alan Frederick Cathcart, 3rd Earl Cathcart (1828–1905)
- Alan Cathcart, 4th Earl Cathcart (1856–1911)
- George Cathcart, 5th Earl Cathcart (1862–1927)
- Alan Cathcart, 6th Earl Cathcart (1919–1999)
- Charles Alan Andrew Cathcart, 7th Earl Cathcart (born 1952)

The heir apparent is the present holder's son Alan George Cathcart, Lord Greenock (born 1986)
