= Sir Samuel Crompton, 1st Baronet =

British politician

Sir Samuel Crompton, Bt DL

Member of Parliament for Thirsk
- In office 1834–1841
- Preceded by: Sir Robert Frankland, Bt.
- Succeeded by: John Bell

Member of Parliament for Derby
- In office 1826–1830 Serving with Henry Frederick Compton Cavendish
- Preceded by: Henry Frederick Compton Cavendish; Thomas Wenman Coke
- Succeeded by: Henry Frederick Compton Cavendish; Edward Strutt

Member of Parliament for East Retford
- In office 1818–1826 Serving with William Evans
- Preceded by: George Osbaldeston; Charles Marsh
- Succeeded by: William Battie-Wrightson; Robert Lawrence Dundas

Personal details
- Born: 8 July 1785
- Died: 27 December 1848 (aged 63)
- Spouse: Isabella Sophia Hamilton (after 1829)
- Children: 4, including Elizabeth Cathcart, Countess Cathcart
- Parent(s): Samuel Crompton; Sarah Fox
- Education: Charterhouse School
- Alma mater: Trinity College, Cambridge

Sir Samuel Crompton, 1st Baronet (8 July 1785 – 27 December 1848) was a politician in the United Kingdom. He served as a Member for Parliament for East Retford, Derby and Thirsk. He also served as Deputy Lieutenant for the North Riding of Yorkshire.

== Early life ==
Crompton was the son and heir in 1810 of Samuel Crompton, a Derby banker, and Sarah (née Fox) Crompton. His father had been the mayor of Derby in 1782 and 1788. His mother was the daughter of Samuel Fox of Derby. The Crompton family was said to be descended from a Reverend John Crompton who settled in Derbyshire at the time of Charles I. Genealogies of the period refer to the family as the Cromptons of Milford House.

He was educated at the Charterhouse School in 1798 before attending Trinity College, Cambridge in 1804.

== Career ==
Crompton sat as a Member of Parliament for East Retford in 1818 and served as that member of parliament until 1826, when he was elected for Derby. He held that seat until 1830. In 1834 he was elected for Thirsk. He supported the premiership of Lord Melbourne but he was not a radical liberal. Such Liberal measures as shortening parliaments or adopting voting by ballot did not enjoy his support. Crompton was created a baronet, of Wood End, Yorkshire, on 21 July 1838. He retired as member for Thirsk in 1841 when he returned to his residence there called Wood End.

Crompton served as Deputy Lieutenant for the North Riding of Yorkshire from 1808.

Escutcheon of the Crompton baronets of Wood End

== Personal life ==
On 3 November 1829, Crompton married Isabella Sophia Hamilton, sixth daughter of the former Frances Henrietta Fremantle and the Hon. Rev. Archibald Hamilton Cathcart (a son of the 9th Lord Cathcart) and niece to the 1st Earl Cathcart. He was survived by his wife and his four daughters, of whom Isabel Sarah Crompton (b. 1833), Fanny Selina Crompton (b. 1835), and Alice Crompton (b. 1837) died young. His only surviving daughter was:

- Elizabeth Mary Crompton (1831–1902), who married Alan Cathcart, 3rd Earl Cathcart, eldest surviving son of Charles Cathcart, 2nd Earl Cathcart, in 1850.

Sir Samuel died on 27 December 1848, aged 63, at the family home. As he died without sons, the baronetcy became extinct.

Parliament of the United Kingdom
Preceded by George Osbaldeston; Charles Marsh	Member of Parliament for East Retford; 1818–1826; With: William Evans	Succeeded by William Battie-Wrightson; Robert Lawrence Dundas
Preceded by Henry Frederick Compton Cavendish; Thomas Wenman Coke	Member of Parliament for Derby; 1826–1830; With: Henry Frederick Compton Cavendish	Succeeded by Henry Frederick Compton Cavendish; Edward Strutt
Preceded by Sir Robert Frankland, Bt.	Member of Parliament for Thirsk; 1834–1841	Succeeded by John Bell
Peerage of the United Kingdom
New creation	Baronet (of Wood End, Yorkshire); 1838–1849	Extinct
Preceded by Hesketh-Fleetwood baronets	Crompton baronets of Wood End; 21 July 1838	Succeeded by Edwards baronets
