= William Cash (writer) =

English journalist (born 1966)

- Born: 1 September 1966 (age 59); London, England
- Education: Magdalene College, Cambridge
- Spouse: Laura Cash née Cathcart
- Children: 2

William Rupert Paul Cash (born 1 September 1966) is a British journalist and author.

Cash is the founder and editor-in-chief of cross-party politico magazine The Mace and The Westminster Index, a Who's Who of politics and public/foreign affairs. He was the founder of Spear's magazine and a director until 2020. Cash was the chairman of the Catholic Herald (UK and US) and the Scottish Catholic Observer until October 2024 and is a columnist and writer for the publication.

== Early life ==
The son of Sir William Cash, the young Cash attended St Anthony's School, Hampstead and Moor Park School before joining Downside School, moving for the sixth form to Westminster School. He then gained a place at Magdalene College, Cambridge, where he read English Literature.

== Career ==
Between 1991 and 1999, Cash worked as Los Angeles correspondent for The Times and The Daily Telegraph. He also contributed to The Observer and The New Republic. An account of his years in California was written up in his first book, Educating William; Memoirs of a Hollywood Correspondent, in which Cash chronicled his adventures as a British journalist in America and his encounters with such figures as David Hockney, Elizabeth Taylor, Hunter Thompson, Tom Wolfe, Jay McInerney, and Antony Haden-Guest. The book was published in 1994 by Simon & Schuster.

Cash became the subject of controversy for his 29 October 1994 article in The Spectator on Jews in Hollywood, "The Kings of the Deal". The article, which alleged the domination of Hollywood by a "Jewish cabal", drew a letter of denunciation signed by Barbra Streisand and fourteen other leading Hollywood personalities accusing Cash of advancing "anti-Semitic stereotypes" and "racist cant." The article also drew attacks from Neal Gabler, from whose book An Empire of Their Own: How the Jews Invented Hollywood (1988) Cash claimed to have taken the term "Jewish cabal", as well as Leon Wieseltier, Neville Nagler, then-chief executive of the Board of Deputies of British Jews, and others. Dominic Lawson, then-editor of The Spectator, defended his decision to publish the article, stating that "I know manic anti-Semitism when I see it, and I'm not in the habit of publishing it.

In 1999, Cash returned to London to write a biography of the novelist Graham Greene, with the permission of the Greene literary estate. His biography focused on Greene's affair with the American beauty Catherine Walston. ''The Third Woman'' was published in 2000 by Little, Brown and Company in the UK and by Carrol and Graff in America.

In 2000, Cash wrote a play, The Green Room, about the life and hospital death of the English linguistic philosopher A. J. Ayer, which was on The Observer's Critics' Choice list for the Edinburgh Festival.

Cash is a member of the Historic Houses Association. He is a heritage campaigner and his political interests have also focused on heritage protection campaigning and rural affairs. He has been a long-standing campaigner for promoting tourism and preserving the England's national heritage. In October 2014 Cash was appointed as Heritage Spokesperson for UKIP. Writing in the Daily Telegraph, Cash said his cause was about 'the preservation of and protection of England's heritage, architecture and green countryside'. He resigned as heritage spokesperson to join the Conservative party after the Referendum of 2016.

He led the Spear's 'Save Our Historic Landscape' campaign, which petitioned David Cameron as prime minister to increase protection for historic environment in the National Planning Policy Framework planning reforms. In 2014, Cash made a submission to the planning minister Greg Clark, arguing for stronger safeguards to protect heritage in the NPPF.

Cash also campaigns for mental health. He was Chairman of the Addcounsel Advisory Board, private provider of individualised care for mental and behavioural health.

Cash's second memoir, Restoration Heart was published by Little, Brown in 2019. It is a memoir about restoring his Shropshire family home after two successive divorces in his forties. It was described by Tatler as "Immensely readable... Laugh-out-loud funny…a delightful true story of love, hope and redemption by one of the foremost society writers of our day". The Millions literary website said it was a ‘paen to hard-won optimism’ and The New Criterion said it was a book ‘to be treasured’, selecting it as an Editor's Pick. The New Statesman recommended it as a memoir of ‘unexpected poignancy’.

== Journalism ==
Cash is a journalist and writes for the Daily Telegraph, The Times, New Statesman, The Sunday Times and The Spectator. He has also contributed to The New Republic, The Times Literary Supplement, The Observer, San Francisco Chronicle Magazine and Los Angeles Magazine.

He is the founder of Spear's business and culture magazine whose majority stake was sold to Mike Danson of Progressive Digital Media in 2010. Magazine. Cash resigned as a director to focus on being editor-in-chief of The Mace, a new cross-party politico and public affairs magazine covering Westminster and Brussels. It has been described by The Daily Telegraph as having an ‘influential’ index as a Westminster Who's Who.

Cash previously published Annabel's Magazine, Annabel's Wine and Cellar Magazine, Aspinalls Magazine, Historic Grand Prix Cars Association Magazine and Sudeley Castle 2006 Magazine.

As chairman of the Catholic Herald, Cash wrote extensively about his pilgrimage walking adventures in Europe and Britain, and collaborated on walks with Dr Guy Hayward, co-founder of the British Pilgrimage Trust. These included leading a Catholic Herald pilgrimage along the Via Francigena to Rome to commemorate the canonisation of Saint John Henry Newman in October 2019, walking the St Cuthbert's Way from Melrose Abbey to Lindisfarne, and walking 140 miles along the Pilgrims' Way from Winchester to Canterbury in the footsteps of Hilaire Belloc in July 2020. Cash stepped down as a director and editor-in-chief in October 2024.

== Personal life ==
Cash is the eldest son of Conservative politician Sir William Cash. He was previously married to the Venezuelan writer and philosopher Vanessa Neumann and Ilaria Bulgari. His third and present wife, Lady Laura Cathcart, a member of the Dames of Malta, is a society milliner and the daughter of Charles Cathcart, 7th Earl Cathcart.

Cash lives at Upton Cressett Hall, Bridgnorth, Shropshire, which he renovated in 2008–2010, hiring the artist Adam Dant to paint a series of six neo-Elizabethan murals which were described as 'daring and original' by John Goodall, architectural editor of Country Life. His family members include the Second World War hero Captain Paul Cash MC and the 19th-century Liberal politician John Bright. He is a distant cousin of the American country singer Johnny Cash, whose family sailed from England and settled in Salem, Massachusetts, in 1667. Cash has been a member of the fund-raising committee of the Churches Conservation Trust and has raised money for heritage organisations, including English Heritage's Blue Plaque scheme.

== Publications, film and plays ==
- The Third Woman: The Secret Passion that Inspired the End of the Affair. a biography of the novelist Graham Greene
- Educating William: Memoirs of a Hollywood Correspondent (1993)
- The Green Room, a biography of the English linguistic philosopher Sir A. J. Ayer
- Restoration Heart: A Memoir, Constable (2019); ISBN 978-1472132185

== Awards ==
- 2007: Winner, Editor of the Year, PPA Independent Publisher Awards
- 2008: Winner, Editor of the Year, PPA Independent Publisher Awards
- 2011: Hudson's Heritage Awards, Upton Cressett Hall, 'Best Hidden Gem' as tourist destination.
