= Charles Allan Cathcart =

British noble and politician (1759–1788)

- The Honorable
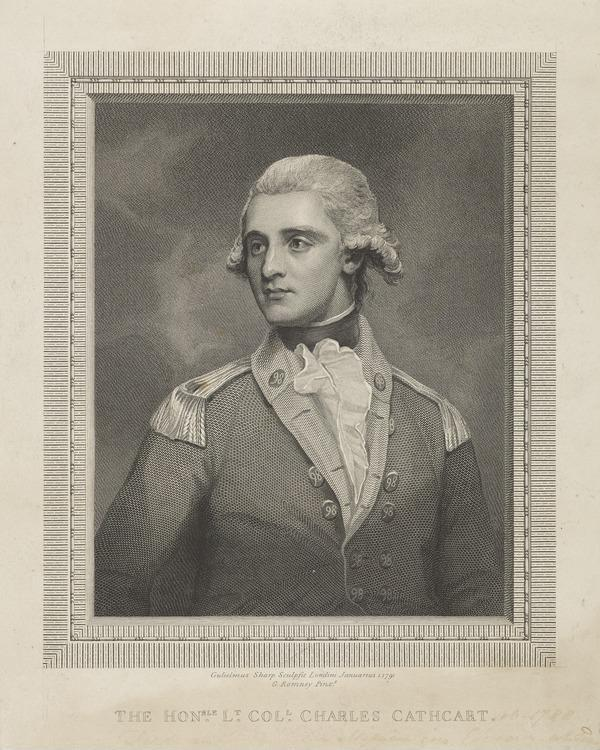
- Born: 28 December 1759
- Died: 10 June 1788 (aged 28); Straits of Bangka off Sumatra
- Buried: 16 June 1788; Anjer-Lor, West Java, Indonesia
- Noble family: Clan Cathcart
- Father: Charles Cathcart, 9th Lord Cathcart
- Mother: Jane, the daughter of Lord Archibald Hamilton
- Occupation: Politician, military officer

Charles Allan Cathcart (28 December 1759 – 10 June 1788) was a British noble and politician. From 1784 to 1788, he served as a member of parliament for Clackmannanshire. In 1787 he was "invested with full powers by His Majesty and the East India Company to open a commercial intercourse with the Emperor of China," dying en route.

== Early life and education ==
Charles Allan Cathcart was born on 28 December 1759. He was the second son of Charles Cathcart, the 9th Lord Cathcart, and Jean, the daughter of Lord Archibald Hamilton. He had an older brother, William, later the 1st Earl Cathcart, and younger brothers Archibald and George. He also had the younger sisters Jane, Mary, and Louisa. He graduated from Eton in 1767. He was educated at Glasgow University, graduating in 1772.

== Career ==
=== Military positions ===
He joined the British Army in the United States in 1776 as a volunteer, until he was commissioned in the 23rd Foot as a 2nd lieutenant in 1777. He became a captain in the 77th Foot in December 1777. While sailing to join the 77th Foot in Ireland from New York City, he was captured by a French privateer. When he was released, in 1780 he was made major and second in command of the 98th Foot under William Fullarton. In 1781 he began serving in India, and he distinguished himself in battle against the French at Cuddalore in June 1783.

=== Member of parliament ===
In the general election for Clackmannan in 1784, Cathcart was an opposition candidate with the support of Sir Thomas Dundas. Winning the election, from the British general election on 10 April 1784 until 10 June 1788 he served as a member of parliament for Clackmannanshire. On 2 and 19 July 1784 he spoke in the House in the East India debates, wherein he "praised Hastings's [sic] ability and integrity, and, concentrating on military organization, urged a clear definition of the status of commanders-in-chief in relation to the civil administration." His words were praised by William Pitt and Henry Dundas, who said they would incorporate some of his proposed reforms into the ultimate bill. He left in 1784 or 1785 for India.

=== Ambassador to China ===
After Cathcart had left for India, Dundas selected him for his "manners and good understanding" to negotiate a commercial treaty with the Emperor of China. Cathcart nominated Captain Erasmus Gower as his preferred captain to carry the embassy but Gower was serving as flag captain to governor John Elliot in Newfoundland at the time and subsequently Cathcart sailed with Captain Richard Strachan in HMS Vestal. He was "invested with full powers by his Majesty and the East India Company to open a commercial intercourse with the Emperor of China." He started his voyage as special envoy to China in 1787, and died on 10 June 1788 en route.

== Death and monument ==
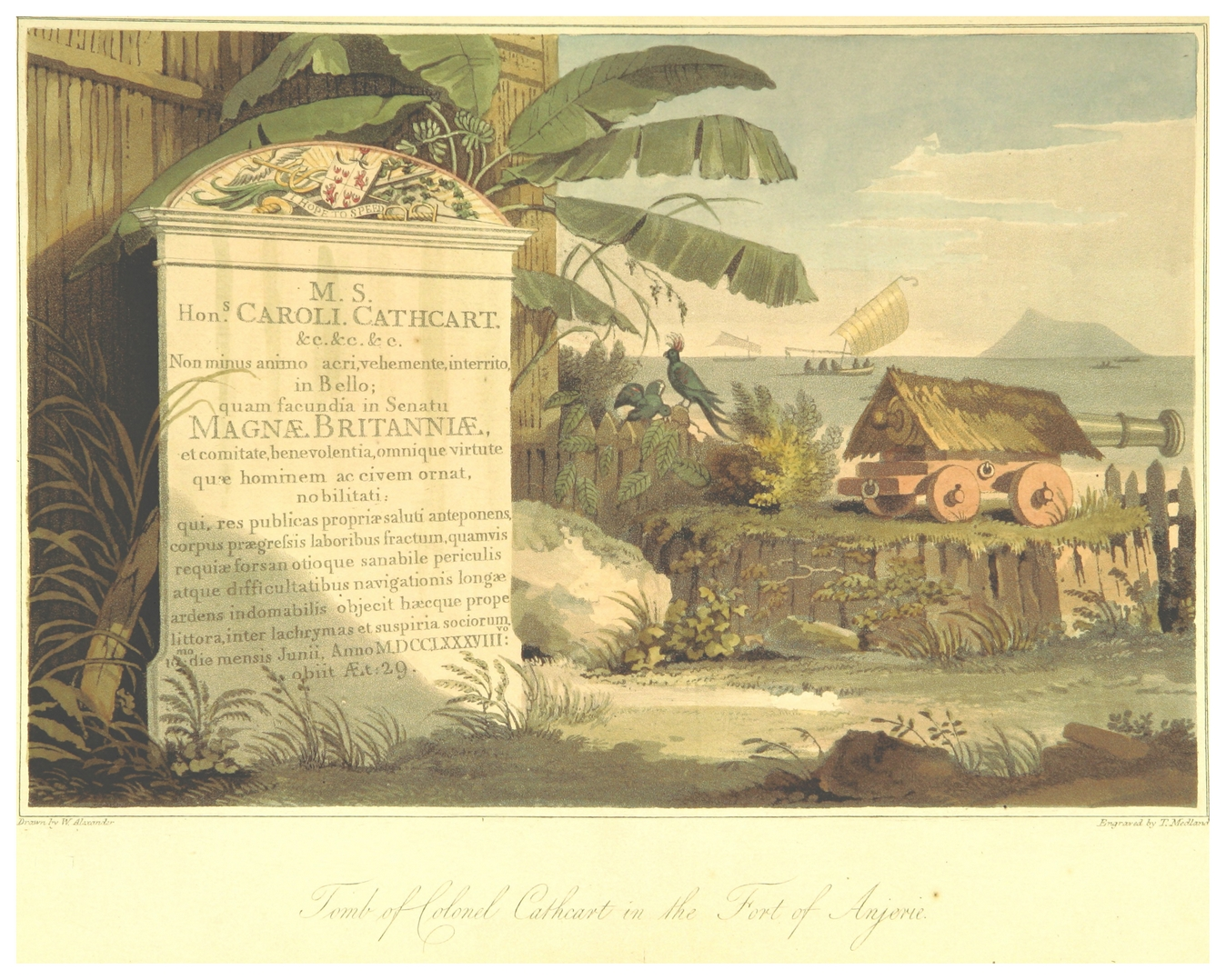
The tombstone of Colonel Charles Cathcart, ambassador to China, who died on his ship and was buried at a Dutch outpost in the Sunda Strait now part of Indonesia.

When Cathcart died at sea aboard the ship Vestal on 10 June 1788 in the Straits of Bangka off Sumatra, the ship returned to Anjer-Lor, West Java, Indonesia, to avoid burial in shark-infested waters. He was interred in the morning of 16 June "to a salute of minute guns fired from the Vestal and of volleys of small arms." Before his companions returned to England, they built him a monument comprising a painted panel with Latin inscriptions, which was designed by Julius Caesar Ibbetson. The monument was built to commemorate Cathcart as "ordered by the Honorable Sir Stamfort Raffles Lieutenant Governor of Java." The following year, Ibbotson displayed his painting of the burial scene at the Royal Academy. A rendition of the monument was also completed by Jacobus Flikkenschild in 1815.

== See also ==
- Clan Cathcart
- List of United Kingdom MPs
- List of University of Glasgow people

Parliament of Great Britain
Preceded by Ralph Abercromby (1774–1780)	Member of Parliament for Clackmannanshire; 1784–1788	Succeeded by Burnet Abercromby (1788–1790)
