= Governor Cathcart =

Governor Cathcart may refer to:

- Charles Cathcart, 2nd Earl Cathcart (1783–1859), Governor General of the Province of Canada and Lieutenant Governor of Canada West from 1845 to 1847
- George Cathcart (1794–1854), Governor of the Cape Colony from 1852 to 1853
