= Thomas Brotherton =

Thomas Brotherton may refer to:

- Thomas of Brotherton, 1st Earl of Norfolk (1300–1338), Lord Marshal of England
- Thomas Brotherton (MP) (c. 1656–1702), British MP for Liverpool and Newton, Lancashire
- Thomas William Brotherton (1782–1868), British general
