= Janne Haaland Matláry =

Norwegian political scientist and politician (born 1957)

Professor Dame Janne Haaland Matláry
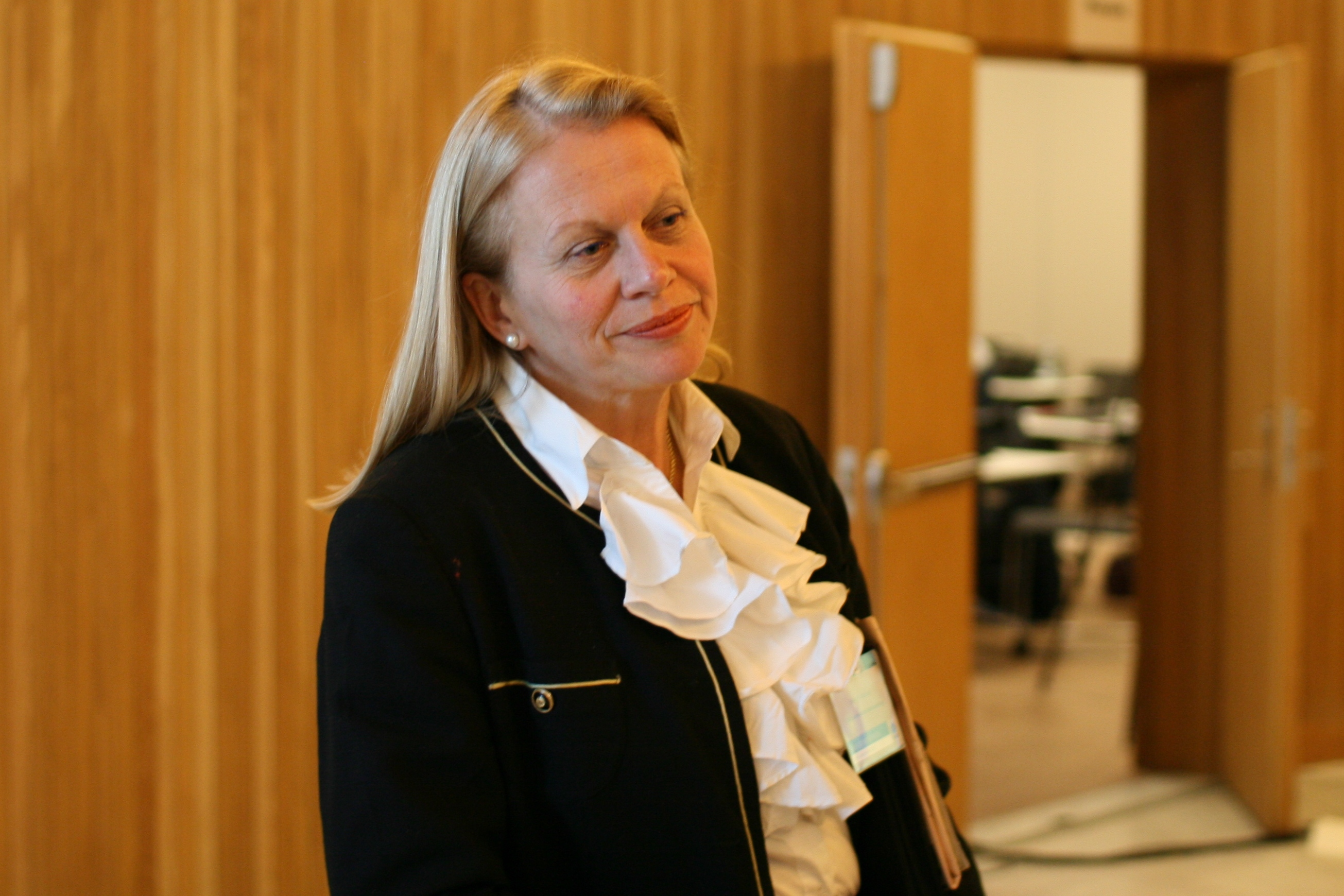
- Born: Janne Haaland; 27 April 1957 (age 69)

Academic work
- Discipline: Political science
- Institutions: University of Oslo

Dame Janne Haaland Matláry (born 27 April 1957) is a Norwegian political scientist, writer, and politician, who formerly represented the Christian Democratic Party. Since 2012 she has been a member of the Conservative Party. She is Professor of international politics at the University of Oslo, and served as State Secretary in the Ministry of Foreign Affairs 1997–2000.

== Life and career ==
She claimed the Christian democratic ideology was incompatible with the socialist ideology.

She spoke at the Humanum interreligious colloquium, in 2014. The event, held at the Vatican, was centered on discussions of marriage and the family.

== Affiliations ==
She is a member of the Pontifical Council for Justice and Peace and of the Pontifical Academy of Social Sciences, and a consultor of the Pontifical Council for the Family. In 2001 she was made a Dame in the Sovereign Military Order of Malta. She is also member of IESE's International Advisory Board (IAB).

== Family ==
Janne Haaland is married to Matláry, a physician of Hungarian origin who came to Norway as a refugee. The couple have four children.

== Writings ==
- Political Factors in Western European Gas Trade (NUPI rapport). Norsk Utenrikspolitisk Institutt, Oslo 1985; ISBN B0006EOPL0
- Norway's New Interdependence with the European Community: The Political and Economic Implications of Gas Trade (NUPI rapport). Utenrikspolitisk Institutt, Oslo 1990; ISBN B0006EVW8E
- Energy Policy in the European Union. Palgrave Macmillan, 1997; ISBN 978-0-312-17295-4
- Intervention for Human Rights in Europe. Palgrave Macmillan, 2002; ISBN 978-0-333-79424-1
- Values and Weapons: From Humanitarian Intervention to Regime Change? Palgrave Macmillan, 2006; ISBN 978-1-4039-8716-7
- Faith through Reason. Gracewing Publishing, 2006; ISBN 978-0-85244-004-9, preface by Joseph Ratzinger.
- When Might Becomes Human Right. Gracewing, 2007; ISBN 978-0-85244-031-5
- European Union Security Dynamics: In the New National Interest. Palgrave Macmillan, 2009; ISBN 978-0-230-52188-9
