= Thomas William Brotherton =

British Army officer

General Sir Thomas William Brotherton GCB
- Born: 10 December 1782; London, England
- Died: 20 January 1868 (aged 85); Esher, Surrey
- Military career
- Allegiance: Great Britain
- Branch: British Army
- Rank: General
- Conflicts: French Revolutionary Wars; Peninsular War
- Awards: GCB

General Sir Thomas William Browne Brotherton, GCB (10 December 1782 – 20 January 1868) was a British Army officer.

== Early life ==
Thomas was the son of William Browne Brotherton and his wife, Mary.

== Military career ==
Brotherton entered the 2nd or Coldstream Guards as an ensign in 1800, was promoted to lieutenant and to captain in 1801, and transferred to the 3rd or Scots Fusilier Guards in 1803. With the guards he served under Ralph Abercromby in Egypt in 1801, and under Lord Cathcart in Hanover in 1805. On 4 June 1807 he exchanged into the 14th Light Dragoons. With it he served almost continuously in the Peninsula from 1808 to 1814. He was in Sir John Moore's retreat to Corunna; he was present at Talavera, at the actions on the Côa, at Bussaco, Fuentes de Oñoro, Battle of Salamanca, where he was wounded, Vitoria, the Pyrenees, the Nivelle, and the Nive, where he was severely wounded and taken prisoner.

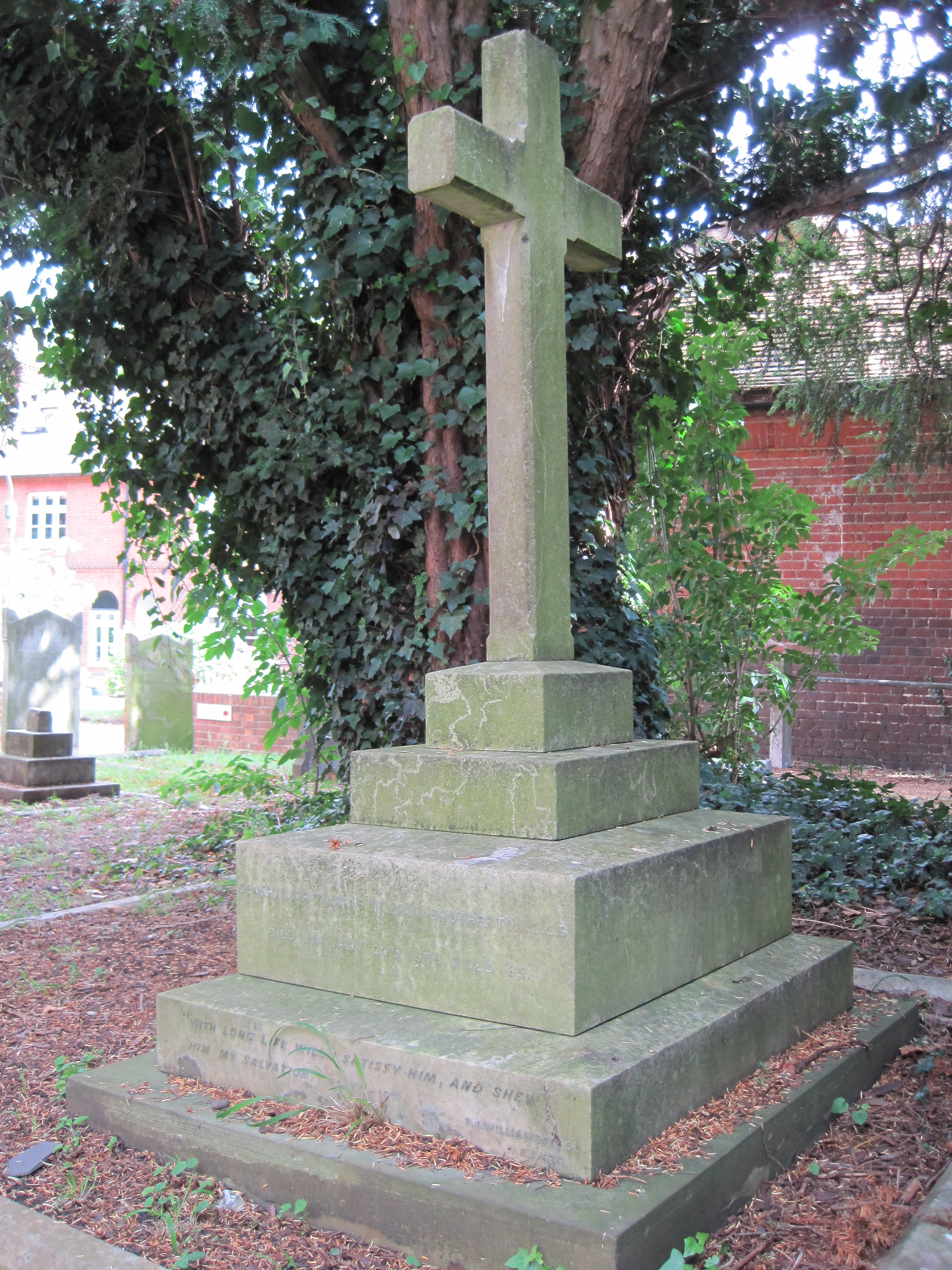
Gravestone of General Sir Thomas Brotherton

Wellington speaks of Brotherton's employment in the Estrella, of his valuable reports, of his conduct at the Côa, and how he was exchanged after the battle of the Nive. He was made major by brevet on Wellington's special recommendation on 28 Nov 1811, promoted major in his regiment on 26 May 1812, promoted to brevet lieutenant-colonel and appointed CB in 1817.

In 1830 he was appointed aide-de-camp to the king and promoted to colonel, in 1841 he was promoted to major-general and in 1844 he became inspector-general of cavalry. In 1849 he was made colonel of the 15th Hussars, in 1850 he was promoted to lieutenant-general and in 1855 he was advanced to KCB. In 1859 he became colonel of the 1st Dragoon Guards, in 1860 he was promoted to full general and in 1861 he was advanced to GCB.

== Marriages ==
Brotherton was married firstly in 1819 to Louisa Anne Straton (1802–1847), the daughter of General John Warde Straton and grand-daughter of Robert Jocelyn, 1st Earl of Roden. By this marriage he had issue an only son, John William Brotherton, who died on 1 September 1878.

In 1865, at the age of eighty, he was married to his second wife, Thomasina Hare, the daughter of the Rev. Walter Hare. Lady Brotherton died, aged 68 years, on 31 May 1895.

== Death ==
Brotherton died in January 1868, aged 85, at his son's house near Esher, now known as Upper Court. He is buried in the churchyard of St. Andrew's Church, Cobham.

He left effects of more than £29,000 (equivalent to £2,835,000 in 2025).

Military offices
Preceded by Sir Robert Wilson	Colonel of the 15th (The King's) Regiment of (Light) Dragoons (Hussars); 1849–1859	Succeeded by Everard William Bouverie
Preceded by The Earl Cathcart	Colonel of the 1st (King's) Dragoon Guards; 1859–1868	Succeeded by Sir James Jackson
