= Charles Cathcart, 7th Earl Cathcart =

Scottish politician

The Right Honourable The Earl Cathcart MCA

Member of the House of Lords
- Lord Temporal
- Hereditary peerage 27 July 1999 – 11 November 1999
- Preceded by: The 6th Earl Cathcart
- Succeeded by: Seat abolished
- Elected Hereditary Peer; 9 March 2007 – 29 April 2026
- By-election: 2007
- Preceded by: The 26th Baron Mowbray
- Succeeded by: Seat abolished

Personal details
- Born: Charles Alan Andrew Cathcart; 30 November 1952 (age 73)
- Party: Conservative
- Spouse: Vivien Clare Skinner (after 1981)
- Children: 2
- Education: Eton College

Charles Alan Andrew Cathcart, the 7th Earl Cathcart (born 30 November 1952), styled Lord Greenock until 1999, is a Scottish peer and Conservative former member of the House of Lords and Chief of the Name and Arms of Clan Cathcart.

== Early life ==
Cathcart was born on 30 November 1952. He is the only son of Alan Cathcart, 6th Earl Cathcart and the former Rosemary Clare Marie Gabrielle Smyth-Osborne. After his mother's death, his father married Marie, Lady Weldon.

Cathcart was educated at Eton College, an all-boys public school in Berkshire. Having attended the Mons Officer Cadet School, he was commissioned in the Scots Guards, British Army, as a second lieutenant on 5 August 1972. On 2 March 1975, he was moved to the Regular Army Reserve of Officers, thereby ending his period of active service. He ceased to belong to the reserve on 5 August 1980.

== Career ==
Lord Cathcart was an Associate Member of the Institute of Chartered Accountants. He succeeded to the title Earl Cathcart upon the death of his father, Alan Cathcart, 6th Earl Cathcart, in 1999.

=== Parliamentary career ===
In 2007 he was elected as one of the 92 remaining hereditary peers, replacing The Lord Mowbray. In April 2019, he opposed an extension to the Article 50 process, stating that "every English and Welsh region outside the M25 would be happy to leave the EU without a deal if no agreement has been reached by the end of next week."

== Personal life ==
In 1981 he married Vivien Clare Skinner; she is an interior decorator under the name Vivien Greenock. Together, they have two children:

- Lady Laura Rosemary Cathcart (born 1984); a member of the Dames of Malta, she married author and journalist William Cash, son of Sir Bill Cash, in 2014.
- Alan George Cathcart, Lord Greenock (born 1986)

=== Descendants ===
Through his daughter, Lady Laura, he is a grandfather of Cosima Cash (born 2015) and Rex William Charles Cash (born 2017).

Peerage of the United Kingdom
Preceded by Alan Cathcart	Earl Cathcart; 1999–present Member of the House of Lords (1999–1999)	Incumbent; Heir apparent: Alan Cathcart, Lord Greenock
Parliament of the United Kingdom
Preceded by The Lord Mowbray	Elected hereditary peer to the House of Lords under the House of Lords Act 1999; 2007–2026	Position abolished under the House of Lords (Hereditary Peers) Act 2026
