= John Bell (Liberal politician) =

British Liberal politician, born 1809

John Bell (6 August 1809 – 5 March 1851) was a Whig politician in the United Kingdom. He is notable as a Member of Parliament who was declared of unsound mind but there was no way of removing him from his seat until his death two years later.

== Family background ==
The Bells are Lords of the Manor of Thirsk in Yorkshire, living in Thirsk Hall, which John Bell inherited from his father, also called John Bell. The Manor has been in the family since the fifteenth century though there had been several cases where there was no direct heir and it had passed to a sister's son who had assumed the name Bell. Their coat of arms features three silver bells.

== Member of Parliament ==
At the general election in June 1841 Bell was elected unopposed as the Member of Parliament (MP) for the borough of Thirsk in Yorkshire. He was a Liberal and described as a "Reformer". He supported universal suffrage and was a member of the National Complete Suffrage Union. He was re-elected for Thirsk, again unopposed, at the general election on 31 July 1847. Subsequently he became increasingly absent from Parliament and in the session to August 1849 he failed to be present for any of the 219 votes.

== Health ==
In July 1849 a Commission of Lunacy was held to determine Bell’s state of mind. A succession of witnesses were called, each of whom testified concerning Bell's mental state, repeating his belief that he was a bird. Bell also told his relatives and acquaintances that, while he was a bird, he could fly much better than a bird, because he kept his shoulders oiled. After the medical witnesses unanimously agreed that Bell was totally incompetent of caring for himself, the jury returned its verdict that Bell was of unsound mind.

Despite this, it was found impossible to remove him from his seat and he continued as the Member for Thirsk until his death in 1851. It was only with the passing of the Lunacy (Vacating of Seats) Act 1886 that it was possible to remove MPs who were of unsound mind.

Parliament of the United Kingdom
Preceded by Samuel Crompton	Member of Parliament for Thirsk; 1841 – 1851	Succeeded by Sir William Payne-Gallwey, Bt
