= Northumberland Shipbuilding Company =

- Company type: Public
- Industry: Shipbuilding
- Founded: 1883
- Defunct: 1930
- Fate: Went in receivership
- Headquarters: Howdon, UK
- Key people: Rowland Hodge

The Northumberland Shipbuilding Company was a shipbuilding business based at Howdon in Tyne and Wear.

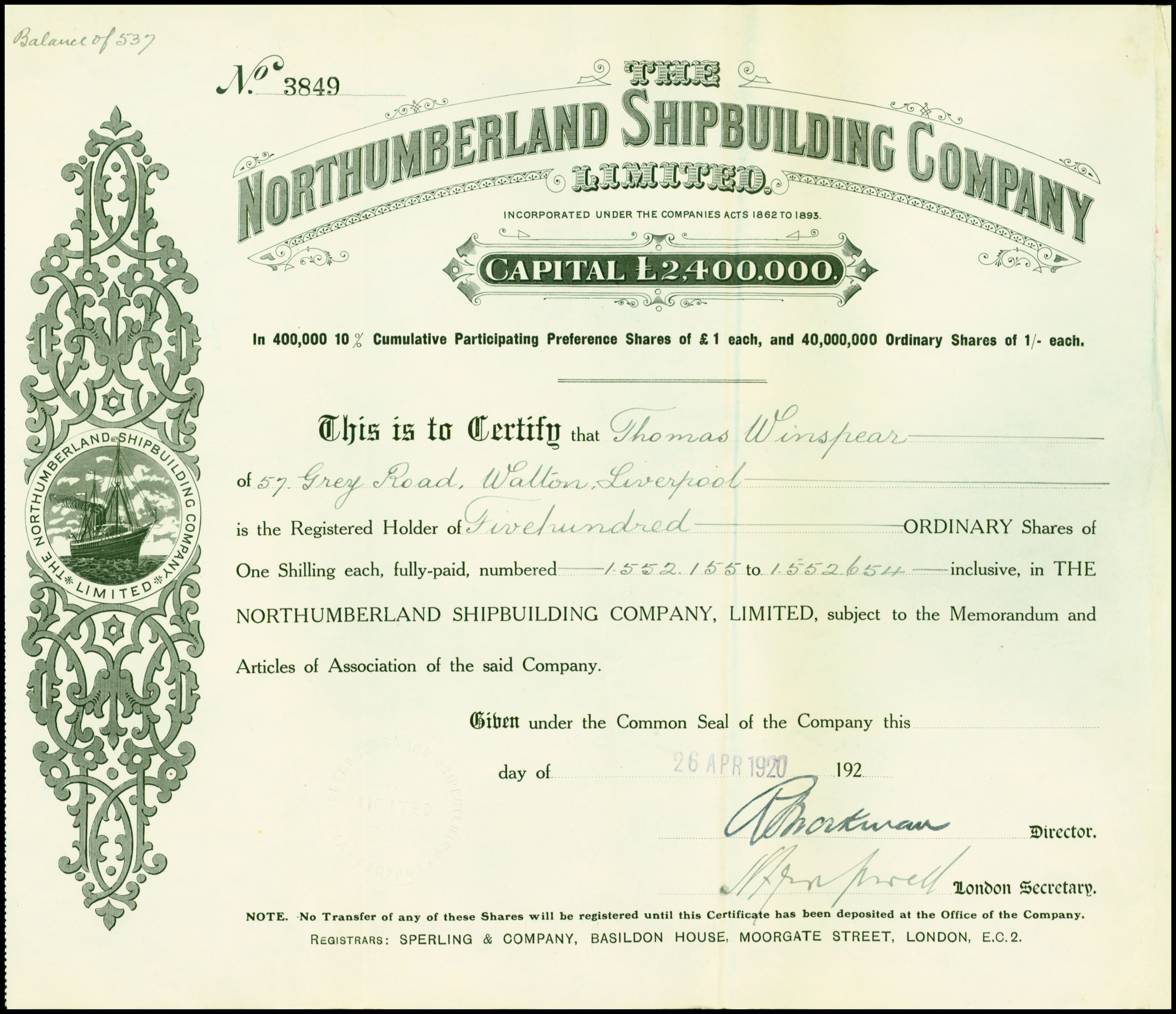
Share of the Northumberland Shipbuilding Company Ltd., issued 26. April 1920

== History ==
The company was established by Harry S. Edwards in Howdon in 1883. Following the death of the founder the business was bought by Rowland Hodge in 1898. At that time Furness Withy were both a major shareholder and a major customer. In 1918 it became a public company and subsequently acquired controlling interests in William Doxford & Sons, Fairfield Shipbuilding and Engineering Company, Workman, Clark and Company, Blythswood Shipbuilding Company, Monmouth Shipbuilding Company and the Lancashire Iron and Steel Company. The combined business was the largest shipbuilding combine in the United Kingdom. Following a collapse in demand and over-ordering of steel the business went into receivership in 1926. It briefly re-opened under new ownership in 1927 but closed again in 1930.
