= Marie Cathcart, Countess Cathcart =

British peeress (1923–2015)

The Right Honourable The Countess Cathcart DStJ
- Born: Marie Isobel French; 18 June 1923
- Died: 25 February 2015 (aged 91)
- Spouses: Sir Thomas Weldon, 8th Baronet (1942–1979) Alan Cathcart, 6th Earl Cathcart (m. 1984; died 1999)
- Children: 2
- Parent(s): Hon. William Joseph French; Victoria Louise Bellasis

Marie Isobel Cathcart, Countess Cathcart, DStJ (née Marie Isobel French, formerly Marie, Lady Weldon) (18 June 1923 – 25 February 2015) was a British peeress.

== Early life ==
She was born Marie Isobel French, eldest daughter of the Hon. William Joseph French, a son of the 4th Baron de Freyne, and Victoria Louise (née Bellasis). She had three siblings. She was educated at Les Oiseaux, Westgate on Sea, Kent, and at Ware, Hertfordshire, by the sisters of the FCJ.

== Career ==
She joined the Wrens as soon as she was old enough to do so in 1941 during World War II. She did voluntary work for various charities throughout her lifetime.

She belonged to the Dames of Malta and was also a Dame of the Venerable Order of St John.

== Personal life ==
On 21 July 1942, Marie married Thomas Weldon (1905–1979) in 1942. He was a son of Sir Anthony Weldon, 6th Baronet and the former Winifred Varty-Rogers. In 1971, upon the death of Thomas' elder brother Anthony, Thomas succeeded as the 8th Weldon baronet. Before his death in 1979, they were the parents of two children:

- Tara Louise Winifred Weldon (1943–2021), who married Alan Christopher Elliot in 1967.
- Sir Anthony William Weldon, 9th Baronet (b. 1947), who married Amanda Ford North, daughter of High Sheriff of Devon Maj. Geoffrey Edward Ford North and Hon. Margaret Isolda de Grey (a daughter of George de Grey, 8th Baron Walsingham), in 1980.

On 25 May 1984, she married widower Alan Cathcart, 6th Earl Cathcart (1919–1999), the only child of George Cathcart, 5th Earl Cathcart and Vera Cathcart, Countess Cathcart. Through her second marriage, she was the stepmother to the 7th Earl Cathcart.

The Countess Cathcart died on 25 February 2015, aged 91.

== Titles ==
- Miss Marie French
- Mrs Thomas Weldon
- Lady Weldon
- Dowager Lady Weldon
- The Rt Hon. The Countess Cathcart (25 May 1984 – 15 June 1999)
- The Rt Hon. The Dowager Countess Cathcart (from 15 June 1999)
