= Rowland Hodge =

English shipbuilder (1859–1950)

Sir Rowland Hodge Bt
- Born: Rowland Frederick William Hodge; 15 September 1859; Sunderland, County Durham, England
- Died: 21 September 1950 (aged 91); Churt, Surrey, England
- Known for: Founder of Northumberland Shipbuilding Company
- Spouses: Mabel Thorpe (m. 1895; died 1923) Vera, Countess Cathcart (m. 1930)
- Children: 4

Sir Rowland Frederick William Hodge, 1st Baronet (15 September 1859 – 21 September 1950) was an English shipbuilder.

== Early life ==
Hodge was born on 15 September 1859 in Sunderland, the son of Emily (née Davis) Hodge and John Rowland Hodge of Newcastle upon Tyne. He was educated at Houghton-le-Spring.

== Career ==
He entered the shipbuilding industry and later founded his own company, the Northumberland Shipbuilding Company, of which he was managing director for more than twenty years. He was also chairman of Eltringhams Ltd, another shipbuilder, and a director of the Canning Town Glass Works in London.

He was created a baronet in the 1921 New Year Honours for his company's services during the First World War, despite a conviction in 1918 for "food hoarding". The Hodges were fined £600 and £100 costs for hoarding over a ton of food.

== Personal life ==
On 28 March 1895, Hodge was married to Mabel Thorpe, a daughter of William Edward Thorpe. Before her death in 1923, they were the parents of two sons and two daughters, including:

- Margaret Viola Hodge (b. 1908), who married Jorge Yvan Lage, son of Jorge Lage, in 1927. She married Sir Robert Spencer Isaacson in 1938.
- Vivien Rosemary Hodge (b. 1911), who married St. John Legh Clowes, son of Capt. Phillip Cecil Clowes, in 1930. They divorced and she married Hugh Gordon Murton-Neale in 1941.
- Sir John Rowland, 2nd Baronet (1913–1995), who married Peggy Ann Kent, daughter of Sidney Raymond Kent, in 1936. They divorced in 1939 and he married Joan Wilson, daughter of Sydney Foster Wilson, in 1939. They divorced in 1961 and he married Jeanne Wood Anderson Buchanan, daughter of Commander W. E. Buchanan, in 1962. The divorced in 1967 and he married Vivienne Knightley, daughter of Alfred Knightley, in 1967.
- Peter Rowland Hodge (1915–1982), who married Mia Macklin, daughter of Sir Noel Macklin, in 1940. They divorced in 1945 and he married Margaret Norma Plow, daughter of Harold Plow, in 1951.

On 30 September 1930, seventy-one year old Sir Rowland was married to Vera Estelle Cathcart, Countess Cathcart, former wife of the George Cathcart, 5th Earl Cathcart, at the Princess Row Register Office in London. The wedding ceremony was followed by a reception at Grosvenor House and a wedding trip to Paris and Monte Carlo. In November 1934, Lady Hodge asked for a divorce, but a court and jury refused to grant Vera a divorce from Sir Rowland on the grounds of misconduct.

Sir Rowland died at his home in Churt, Surrey on 23 September 1950.

=== Descendants ===
Through his eldest son, he was a grandfather of Sir Andrew Rowland Hodge, 3rd Baronet (b. 1968), Wendy Madeleine Hodge (second wife of John Kidd, and mother of Jemma Wellesley, Countess of Mornington, supermodel Jodie Kidd and polo player Jack Kidd), Vicki Hodge (one-time girlfriend of both John Bindon and Prince Andrew, Duke of York), and model Sally Joan Hodge (mother of Anthony Joseph Hodge Clavien and Alana Nicole Hodge Sindelar).

== In popular culture ==
The BBC programme Who Do You Think You Are? broadcast on 24 September 2008, in which model Jodie Kidd traced her ancestors (Hodge was her great-grandfather), suggested that he may have bought his honour from David Lloyd George, part of the scandal that led to the Honours (Prevention of Abuses) Act 1925.

The programme reported that the archives of Parliament contain letters to Lloyd George, from Winston Churchill complaining of having been offered a bribe of £5,000, and from King George V complaining of the honour having been granted.

== See also ==
- Hodge baronets

Baronetage of the United Kingdom
New creation	Baronet (of Chipstead); 1921–1950	Succeeded by John Hodge
