= Gateley =

Village in Norfolk, England

Coordinates: 52.78153°N 0.90390°E

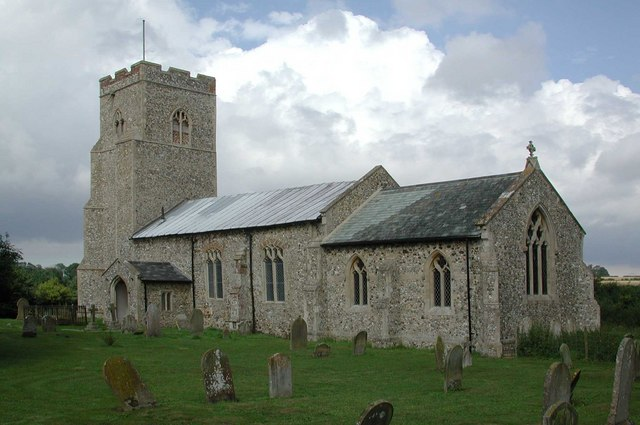
- St Helen's Church

- Location within Norfolk
- Area: 2.37 sq mi (6.1 km^{2})
- OS grid reference: TF959243
- Civil parish: Gateley
- District: Breckland
- Shire county: Norfolk
- Region: East
- Country: England
- Sovereign state: United Kingdom
- Post town: DEREHAM
- Postcode district: NR20
- Dialling code: 01328
- Police: Norfolk
- Fire: Norfolk
- Ambulance: East of England
- UK Parliament: Mid Norfolk

Gateley is a village and civil parish in the Breckland district of the English county of Norfolk.

Gateley is located 8.7 km (5.4 mi) north of the town of Dereham and 22.7 km (14.1 mi) north-west of the city of Norwich, along the course of the River Wensum.

== History ==
Gateley's name is of Anglo-Saxon origin and derives from the Old English for 'goat wood or clearing.'

In the Domesday Book of 1086, Gateley is listed as a settlement of 31 households in the hundred of Launditch. In 1086, the village was part of the East Anglian estates of Alan Rufus, Bishop of Thetford, Hugh de Montfort and Peter de Valognes.

During the Second World War, a 'starfish' decoy site was built in Gateley to direct German bombers away from nearby RAF West Raynham.

== Geography ==
Due to its small size, Gateley's population has been combined with nearby North Elmham for the last three censuses.

Gateley is located along the course of the River Wensum.

== St. Helen's Church ==
The parish church of Gateley is called St Helen's. The nave dates from the 15th century. The chancel is a Victorian rebuilding. The church tower is of the Perpendicular style. There are two shields on south-west buttress. Tower has rectangular vice, the belfry windows have been partly blocked. On south side of the nave is a round headed arch made up of late medieval tiles although the doorway is of late Saxon origins. The south porch has three niches. The church floor has been renewed but is of brick. The primitive font has a marble plinth . There is a rood screen with fine paintings thought to be East Anglia, which are of a local flavour. The Saints chosen for the screen are for local devotions. From left to right they are Saint Etheldreda, foundress of the Diocese of Ely shown as a nun with a Latin inscription, Scta Adria, or Saint Audrey. Next is Saint Elizabeth, also shown dressed in a nun's habit and her arms crossed as if in an echo of the Visitation, The Blessed Virgin, turned to face her cousin. A third image is of the Mistress of Ridibowne, a local devotion. Virtually nothing is known about her. Ridibowne was probably either Redbowne in Lincolnshire or Redbowne in Hertfordshire. On the other side of the screen are paintings of Saint Louis of France, Henry VI labelled in Latin as 'the Blessed Martyr Henry VI', St Augustine and Sir John Schorne, conjuring the devil into a boot. Sir John Schorne was a clergyman, he is said to be best known for his ability to cure the gout.

== Gateley Hall ==
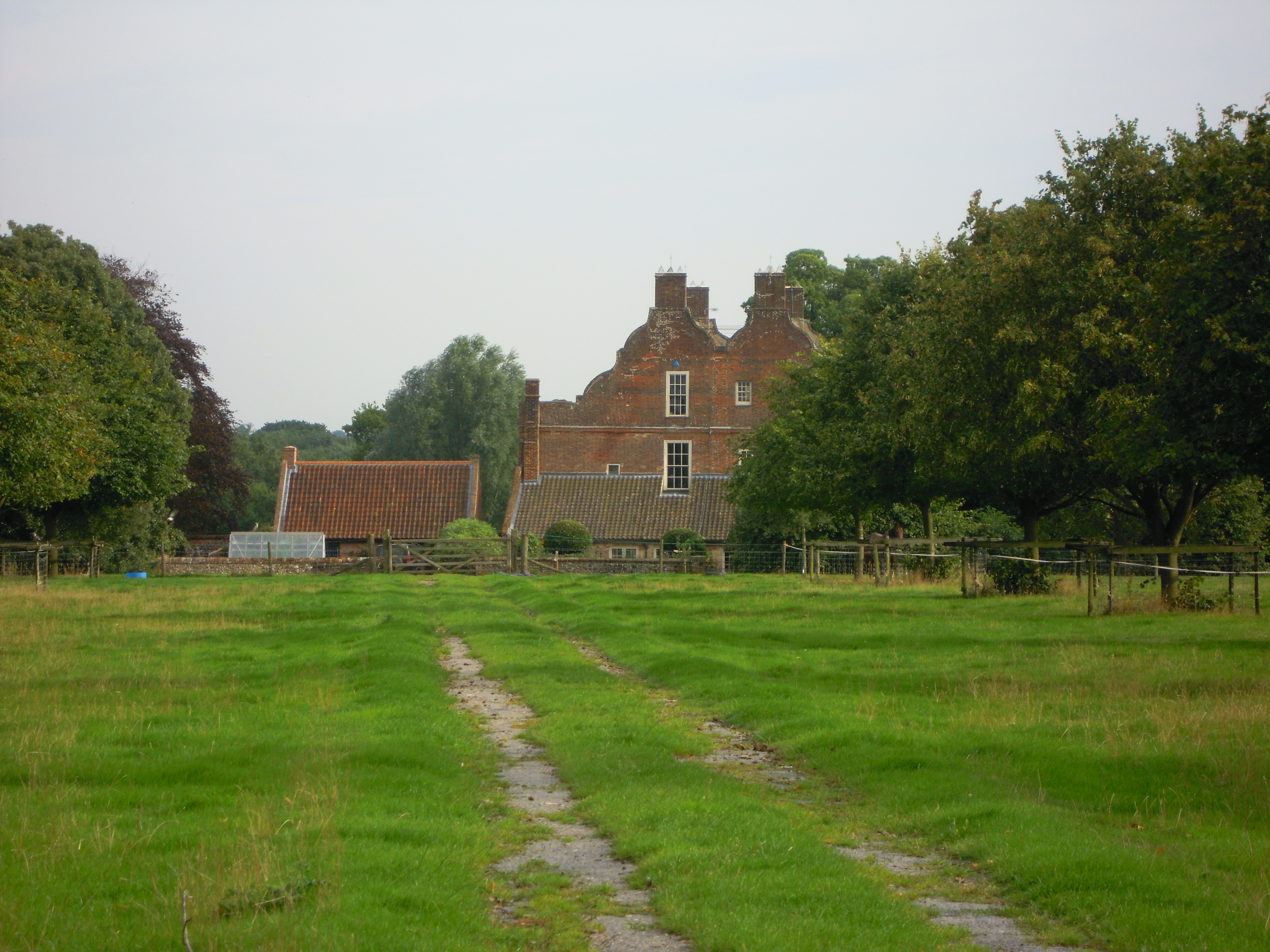
Gateley Hall

Gateley Hall is an English Heritage Grade I listed building which was built in 1726, on the site of an older manor house.

The early Georgian house has double shaped gables at each end. On the south gable is an illegible date plaque thought to be 1726, the plaque is paired by a sundial. The front elevation stands over five bays topped with parapets and is of two storeys. Another architectural feature of the house is the Roman Doric doorcase which has the same slightly chequered brickwork as the gables, but has been cemented over. On the rear elevation there is a round brick projecting bay and a flint bay with small blocked windows. Inside the house the half-turn staircase with landings dates from 1726. The stair has Turned attenuated vase at the balusters and shaped tread-ends and a wide swept handrail. There are examples of Rococo plaster and wood decoration. The grade I listing was put on the building in 1954 partly due to the exceptional quality and rarity of Rococo plasterwork to the interior of the house. There is also a fine barn dating from the 16th Century.

The house is the current seat of the 7th Earl Cathcart, Charles Alan Andrew Cathcart.

== Governance ==
Gateley is part of the electoral ward of Upper Wensum for local elections and is part of the district of Breckland.

The village's national constituency is Mid Norfolk which has been represented by the Conservative's George Freeman MP since 2010.
