= Charles Stourton, 26th Baron Mowbray =

British peer (1923–2006)

The Right Honourable The Lord Mowbray CBE

Member of the House of Lords
- Lord Temporal
- Hereditary peerage 9 June 1965 – 11 November 1999
- Preceded by: The 25th Baron Mowbray
- Succeeded by: Seat abolished
- Elected Hereditary Peer; 11 November 1999 – 12 December 2006
- Election: 1999
- Preceded by: Seat established
- Succeeded by: The 7th Earl Cathcart

Personal details
- Born: 11 March 1923
- Died: 12 December 2006 (aged 83)

Charles Edward Stourton, 23rd Baron Stourton, 27th Baron Segrave, 26th Baron Mowbray CBE (11 March 1923 – 12 December 2006) was an English peer. He sat on the Conservative benches in the House of Lords and was a Conservative whip in government and in opposition from 1967 to 1980. He was one of the 92 hereditary peers elected to keep their seat in the reformed House of Lords under the House of Lords Act 1999.

== Family ==
Mowbray was the only son of William Marmaduke Stourton, 22nd Baron Stourton, 26th Baron Segrave, and 25th Baron Mowbray, and Sheila Gully, a granddaughter of William Court Gully, 1st Viscount Selby, who served as Speaker of the House of Commons from 1895 to 1905. He had one sister.

Through his father, he was descended from a brother of Geoffrey de Mowbray, Bishop of Coutances, who was an adviser to William the Conqueror. Another relative, William de Mowbray, was one of the barons who forced King John to put his seal to Magna Carta in 1215; as a direct descendant, Charles travelled to Washington, DC in 1976 with a parliamentary delegation that presented one of the four copies of the Magna Carta held by the British Museum to the US Congress.

== Education and military service ==
He was educated at Ampleforth College and Christ Church, Oxford, and served as a lieutenant in the Grenadier Guards in the Second World War. He was injured and lost his right eye near Caen in 1944. He left the Army in 1945, and ran a pig farm on the family estate in Yorkshire.

== Marriage and children ==
Mowbray married Jane de Yarburgh-Bateson, the only child of Stephen de Yarburgh-Bateson, 5th Baron Deramore, in 1953. They had two sons. His elder son Edward (born 17 April 1953) succeeded him as Lord Mowbray.

His wife died in 1998, and in 1999 he married Joan, Lady Holland (née Street), widow of Sir Guy Holland.

== Political career ==
Stourton was Gold Stick Officer at the coronation of Elizabeth II in 1953. He was a councillor on Nidderdale Rural District Council from 1954 to 1959.

His parents separated in 1961, in a case that drew significant publicity. His father was labelled "egocentric" and his mother was granted a decree of judicial separation on the grounds of her husband's cruelty. Stourton subsequently took his father to court over disputes concerning the administration of the family estates. The case was later settled.

He inherited three baronies when his father died in 1965. The Barony of Mowbray is the third most senior barony in the Peerage of England, after the baronies of Ros and Despencer. However, since Georgiana Lady de Ros was female, and Lord le Despencer is also Viscount Falmouth, he followed his father as premier baron of England, losing that distinction in 1983 when Lady de Ros died and was succeeded by her son. His father's will left most of his estate to his 12-year-old grandson, Edward, with little provision for his wife or son. The family seat at Allerton Park, near Knaresborough in Yorkshire, perhaps the most important Gothic Revival stately home in England, was left in trust until Edward was 30. The house was leased to an American businessman in 1983.

Recognisable by his eyepatch, he sat on the Conservative benches and rarely departed from the Conservative party line. He became an opposition whip in 1967, and continued as a Conservative whip for 13 years until he resigned in 1980. As a lord-in-waiting, he was often called upon to greet visiting heads of state at Heathrow Airport. He was twice Chancellor of the Primrose League, from 1975 to 1979 and from 1981 to 1984. He was also a spokesman on the environment for the government of Edward Heath from 1970 to 1974, and on transport, the environment, and the arts for the government of Margaret Thatcher from 1979 to 1980. He was made a Commander of the Order of the British Empire in 1982. After the House of Lords Act 1999, he was elected as one of the 92 hereditary peers to keep a seat in the reformed House. He sat on the House of Lords Committee of Privileges and was a captain of the House of Lords shooting team.

A Roman Catholic, he was vice-president of the British Association of the Sovereign Military Order of Malta, and was also its longest-serving Knight. Mowbray also served as President and Delegate of the British and Irish Association of the Sacred Military Constantinian Order of St George under the Grand Master, the Duke of Castro between 1975–2000.

He became a director of Securicor in the 1960s. He was chairman of Thames Estuary Airport Company from 1993.

Peerage of England
Preceded by William Stourton	Baron Mowbray; Baron Segrave; Baron Stourton; 1965–2006; Member of the House of Lords (1965–1999)	Succeeded by Edward Stourton
Parliament of the United Kingdom
New office created by the House of Lords Act 1999	Elected hereditary peer to the House of Lords under the House of Lords Act 1999; 1999–2006	Succeeded by The Earl Cathcart
