= Alan Cathcart, 3rd Earl Cathcart =

Landowner and agricultural writer

The Right Honourable The Earl Cathcart JP DL LL.D.
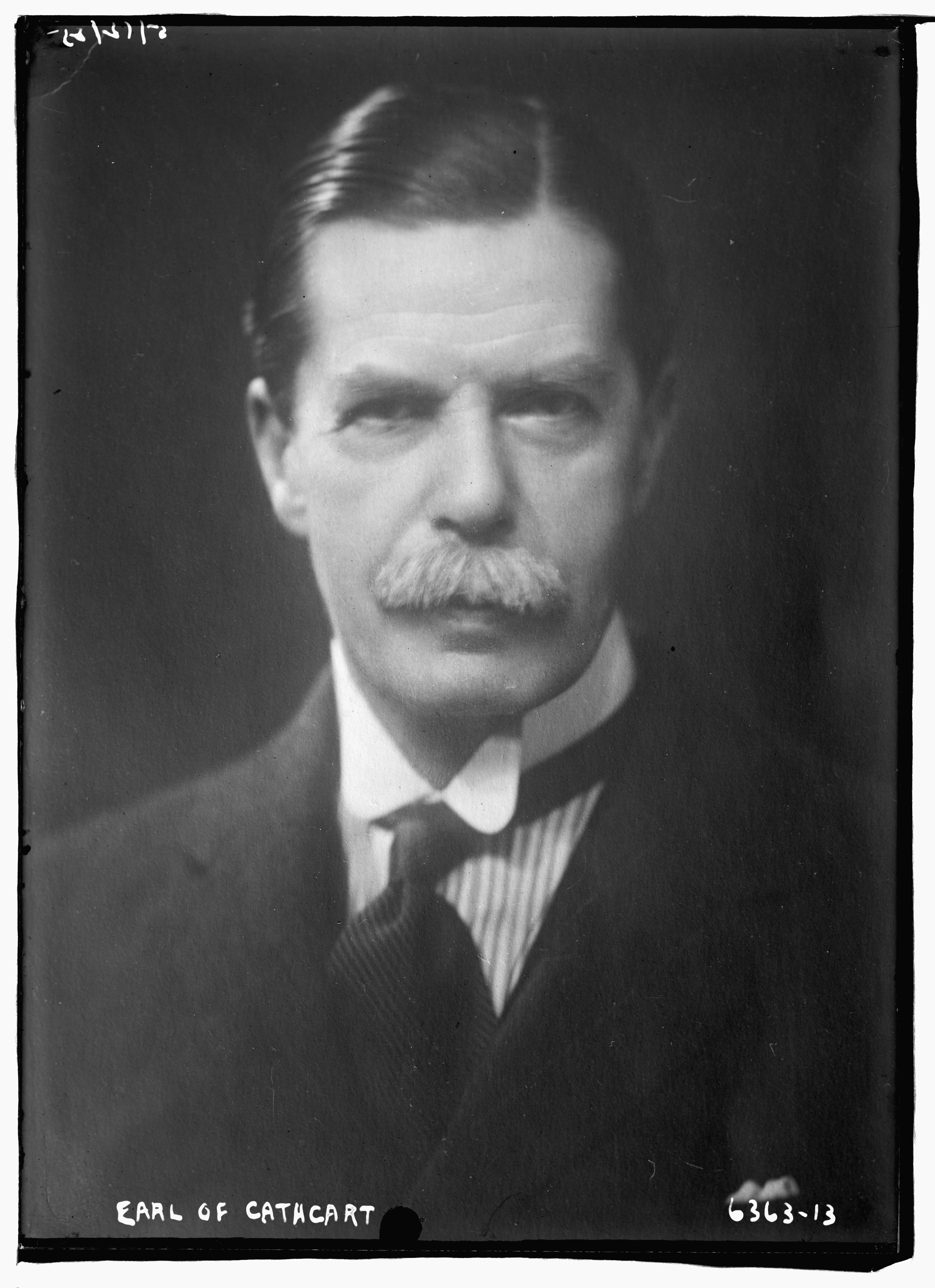

Personal details
- Born: Alan Frederick Cathcart; 14 November 1828
- Died: 30 October 1905 (aged 76)
- Spouse: Elizabeth Mary Crompton (after 1850)
- Children: 11
- Parent(s): Charles Cathcart, 2nd Earl Cathcart; Henrietta Mather
- Education: Scottish Naval and Military Academy

Alan Frederick Cathcart, 3rd Earl Cathcart JP, DL (1828–1905) was a wealthy landowner and writer on agriculture. Cathcart introduced the term "economic ornithology" at a time when there was a public debate over whether the English sparrow was a pest or a friend of the farmer.

== Early life ==
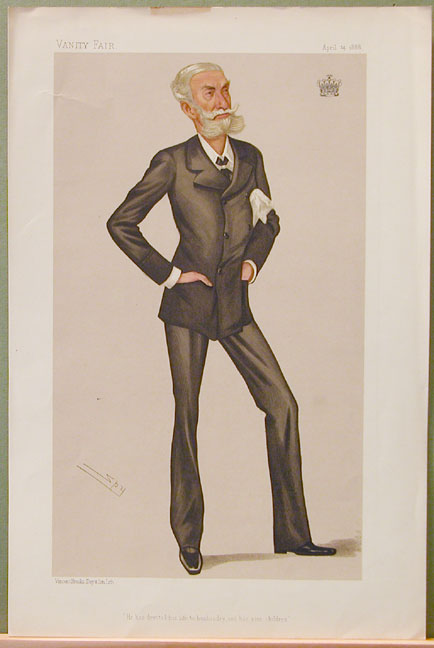
"He has devoted his life to husbandry and has nine children" — caricature of the Earl Cathcart by Spy in Vanity Fair, 1888

Cathcart was the second, but eldest surviving, son of Charles Cathcart, 2nd Earl Cathcart and the former Henrietta Mather (second daughter of Thomas Mather). His father was the Commander-in-Chief, Scotland and of North America and served as the Governor General of Canada.

He was educated in Edinburgh at the Scottish Naval and Military Academy, which was founded in 1825 and closed in 1869.

== Career ==
He was commissioned into the 23rd Foot as a Second lieutenant in 1845 and was promoted to Lieutenant in 1848. He served as Aide-de-camp to his father in Canada 1849–50, but resigned from the Regular Army on his marriage in 1850. When the part-time Militia was reformed in 1852 he was one of the younger officers appointed to the North York Rifle Militia as a Captain, and was enthusiastic in procuring recruits.

He was rapidly promoted to Major (1853) and Lieutenant-Colonel (1854). However, he resigned in 1855 in protest at what he saw as a lack of support from the Colonel. When the Volunteer Force was formed he was appointed on 7 July 1860 as Lieutenant-Colonel of the 1st Administrative Battalion of Yorkshire North Riding Rifle Volunteers (later the 1st Volunteer Battalion, Green Howards), and became its Honorary Colonel on 17 June 1871; he was awarded the Volunteer Officers' Decoration. After he left the Regular Army he devoted himself to agriculture and county business in Yorkshire. Cathcart was president of the Royal Agricultural Society in 1872–1873. He owned 5554 acres.

== Personal life ==
On 2 April 1850 Cathcart married Elizabeth Mary Crompton, the eldest daughter and heiress of Sir Samuel Crompton, 1st Baronet and the former Isabella Sophia Cathcart (second daughter of the Rev. Hon. Archibald Hamilton Cathcart, third son of Charles Cathcart, 9th Lord Cathcart). Together, they were the parents of five sons and six daughters, including:

- Hon. Isabel Cathcart (1851–1856), who died young.
- Alan Cathcart, 4th Earl Cathcart (1856–1911), who died unmarried.
- Lady Cecilia Cathcart (1857–1932), who married Capt. Edward Temple Rose, third son of Sir John Rose, 1st Baronet, in 1883.
- Hon. Charles Cathcart (1858–1880), a Lieutenant who died unmarried.
- George Cathcart, 5th Earl Cathcart (1862–1927).
- Lady Ida Cathcart (1866–1929), who married Sir Thomas Hare, 1st Baronet, in 1886.
- Lady Marion Cathcart (1867–1955).
- Lady Emily Cathcart (1868–1960).
- Hon. Reginald Cathcart (1870–1900), a Captain who served in the Second Boer War and was killed at the Relief of Ladysmith in South Africa.
- Hon. Archibald Cathcart (1873–1955).
- Lady Eva Cathcart (1874–1960).

In 1894 he was awarded an Hon. LL.D. by the University of Cambridge.

Peerage of the United Kingdom
Preceded by Charles Cathcart	Earl Cathcart; 1859–1905	Succeeded by Alan Cathcart
