= Alan Cathcart, 6th Earl Cathcart =

British Army general (1919–1999)

Major-General The Right Honourable The Earl Cathcart CB DSO MC KStJ
- Born: 22 August 1919
- Died: 15 June 1999 (aged 79)
- Military career
- Allegiance: United Kingdom
- Branch: British Army
- Service years: 1939–1973
- Rank: Major-General
- Commands: British Forces in Berlin (1970–73); Yorkshire District (1969–70); 152nd Infantry Brigade (1965–66); 1st Battalion Scots Guards (1957–59)
- Conflicts: Second World War
- Awards: Companion of the Order of the Bath; Distinguished Service Order; Military Cross; Mentioned in Despatches; Knight of the Order of St. John

Major-General Alan Cathcart, 6th Earl Cathcart, CB, DSO, MC, KStJ (22 August 1919 – 15 June 1999), styled Lord Greenock until 1927, was a British Army officer who served as Commandant of the British Sector in Berlin from 1970 until his retirement in 1973.

== Military career ==
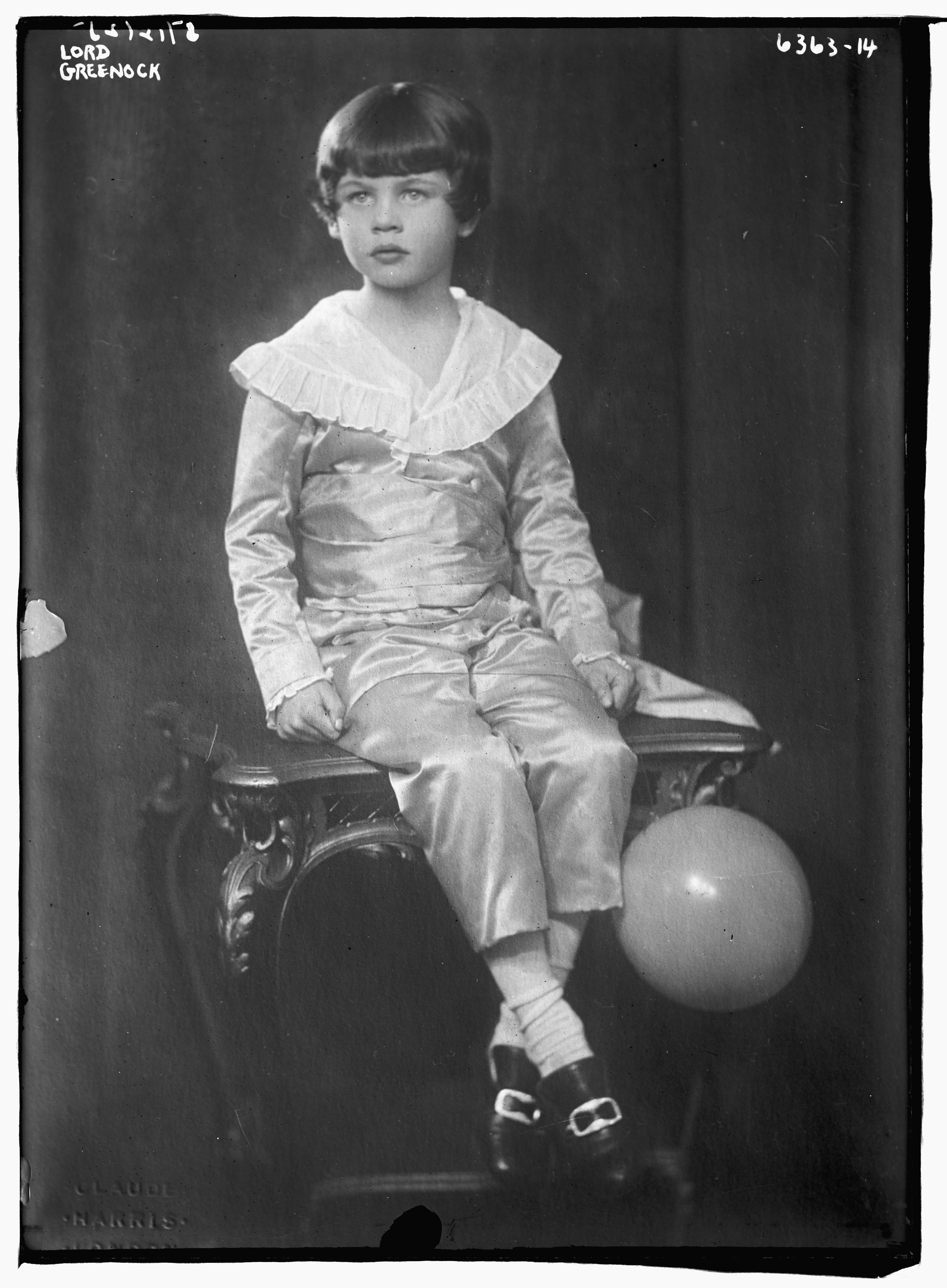
The then Lord Greenock in 1925

The only child of George Cathcart, 5th Earl Cathcart and Vera, Countess Cathcart, Alan was educated at Eton College and Magdelene College, Cambridge, Cathcart was commissioned into the Scots Guards in 1939. He served in the Second World War and went on to be adjutant at the Royal Military Academy Sandhurst after the war. He was made adjutant of the Scots Guards in 1951 and Brigade Major for the 4th Guards Brigade in 1954. He was then appointed commanding officer of the 1st Battalion Scots Guards in 1957.

Cathcart was posted to Scottish Command in 1962 and became commander of the 152nd Infantry Brigade in 1965. He next transferred to the Operations Division of Supreme Headquarters Allied Powers Europe in 1967 and was appointed General Officer Commanding Yorkshire District in 1969. Finally he was appointed Commandant of the British Sector in Berlin in 1970: he retired in 1973.

In retirement from the British Army, Cathcart became a Deputy Speaker of the House of Lords.

== Family ==
In 1946 Cathcart married Rosemary Clare Marie Gabrielle Smyth-Osborne. They had one son and two daughters. Following the death of his first wife, he married Marie Isobel Weldon in 1984.

Military offices
Preceded by Sir James Bowes-Lyon	Commandant, British Sector in Berlin; 1970–1973	Succeeded by Sir David Scott-Barrett
Peerage of the United Kingdom
Preceded by George Cathcart	Earl Cathcart; 1927–1999	Succeeded by Charles Cathcart
