= Dames of Malta =

Fraternal religious orders for women

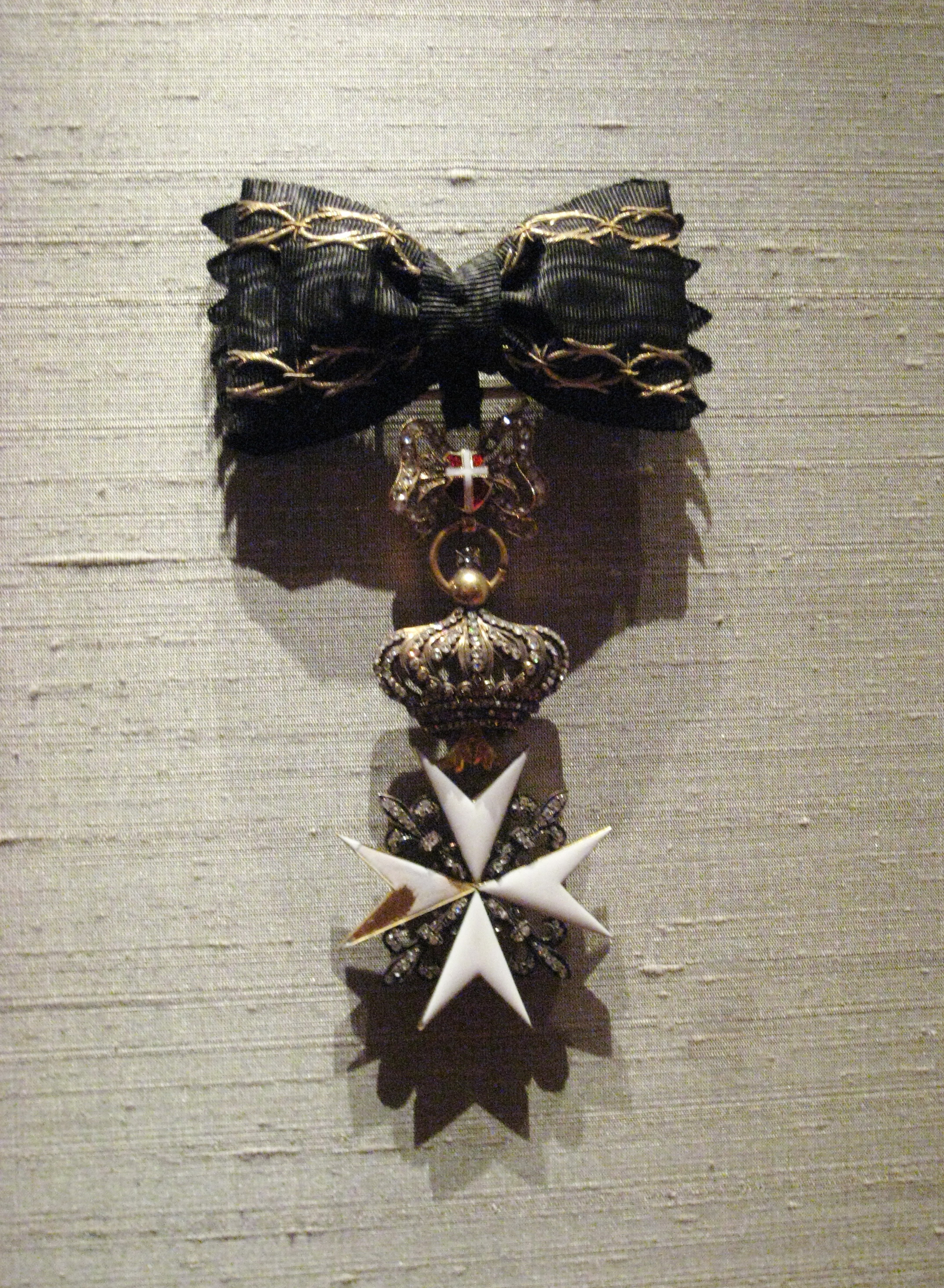
Badge of Dame Grand Cross of Honour and Devotion - Malta (1st half of 20th century)

Dames of Malta refers to either the female Protestant fraternal order known as Ladies of the Knights Hospitallers of St. John of Jerusalem or to female members of the Roman Catholic Sovereign Military Order of Malta (Sovereign Hospitaller Order of St. John of Jerusalem of Rhodes and of Malta).

== Protestant order ==
This secret fraternal order, also known as Ladies of the Knights Hospitallers of St. John of Jerusalem, was originally named Ladies of Malta. In 1902, it was consolidated with the Daughters of Malta, and assumed the name "Dames of Malta." These Dames are an auxiliary to the Ancient and Illustrious Order Knights of Malta. Their governing body is known as "Zenodacia," the branches are called "Sisterhoods" and are under the jurisdiction of the Supreme Grand Commandery of the Ancient and Illustrious Order of Malta. Candidates for membership must be "white female Protestants, over sixteen years of age, not married to a Roman Catholic, able to write and speak the English language, competent to pursue some useful occupation, believers in the doctrines of the Holy Trinity as expressed in the Apostles' Creed."

The "ritualistic work" of the Order unfolds "the marvelous history of its glorious past [the Order claims to be the direct descendant of the ancient Sisterhood of the Hospitallers Dames of Jerusalem] and "the deep religious significance of its institution", and glories in "the fact that it is the only Knightly Order having one Universal Password that admits to all Council Chambers around the Globe." In 1924, the membership of the Dames of Malta was 28,000. In 1978, the membership was over 5,000. The headquarters were at 1345 Arch St., Philadelphia, Pennsylvania.

== Roman Catholic order ==
Notable female members of the Sovereign Military Order of Malta include:

- Genevieve Garvan Brady, Papal Duchess, Dame of the Order of the Holy Sepulchre, holder of the Cross Pro Ecclesia et Pontifice
- Anne M. Burke
- Bernadette Castro
- Mary Higgins Clark
- Marianna, Dowager Viscountess Monckton of Brenchley, served as High Sheriff of Kent (1981–82); widow of Gilbert Walter Riversdale Monckton, 2nd Viscount Monckton of Brenchley
- Marie-Louise Coleiro Preca, Maltese politician; president of Malta (2014 to 2019) and president of Eurochild (since 2019)
- Virginia A. Dwyer, director and deputy chairman of the Federal Reserve Bank of New York; chairman of the board of trustees of the University of Rochester
- Clare Boothe Luce, American playwright and political activist
- Marie-Christine, Princess Michael of Kent
- Marie Isobel, Countess Cathcart
- Princess Maria Ludwiga Theresia of Bavaria
- Janne Haaland Matláry
- Patricia Mary, Lady Talbot of Malahide (née Riddell)
- Mary McShain (née Mary J. Horstmann), great-niece of Bishop Ignatius F. Horstmann (the third Bishop of the Diocese of Cleveland); widow of businessman John McShain
- Regina A. Quick, American philanthropist
- Sharon Rich, American author
- Karen Garver Santorum, American nurse and activist; wife of United States Senator Rick Santorum (R-PA)
- Phyllis Schlafly, American constitutional lawyer and conservative activist
- Princess Urraca of Bourbon-Two Sicilies
- Csilla von Boeselager, Hungarian philanthropist; founded the Hungarian Maltese Charity Organisation (Ungarischer Malteser Caritas Dienst)
- Elisabeth von Thurn und Taxis, German journalist, author, socialite, and art collector
- Gloria von Thurn und Taxis, German socialite, businesswoman, Catholic activist, art collector

=== Others ===
- Emma, Lady Hamilton (1765-1815) was awarded the Order of Saint John of Jerusalem (Maltese Cross), order of the Russian Empire named after Saint John the Baptist, by Emperor Paul I of Russia for her aid to blockaded Malta. Lady Hamilton was the first English woman to be invested as a Dame of Malta.
- Grand Duchess Maria Vladimirovna of Russia (born 1953), disputed claimant since 1992 to the headship of the House of Romanov, the Imperial Family of Russia (who reigned as Emperors and Autocrats of all the Russias from 1613 to 1917).
