= Commander-in-Chief, North America =

British Army position (1755–1867)

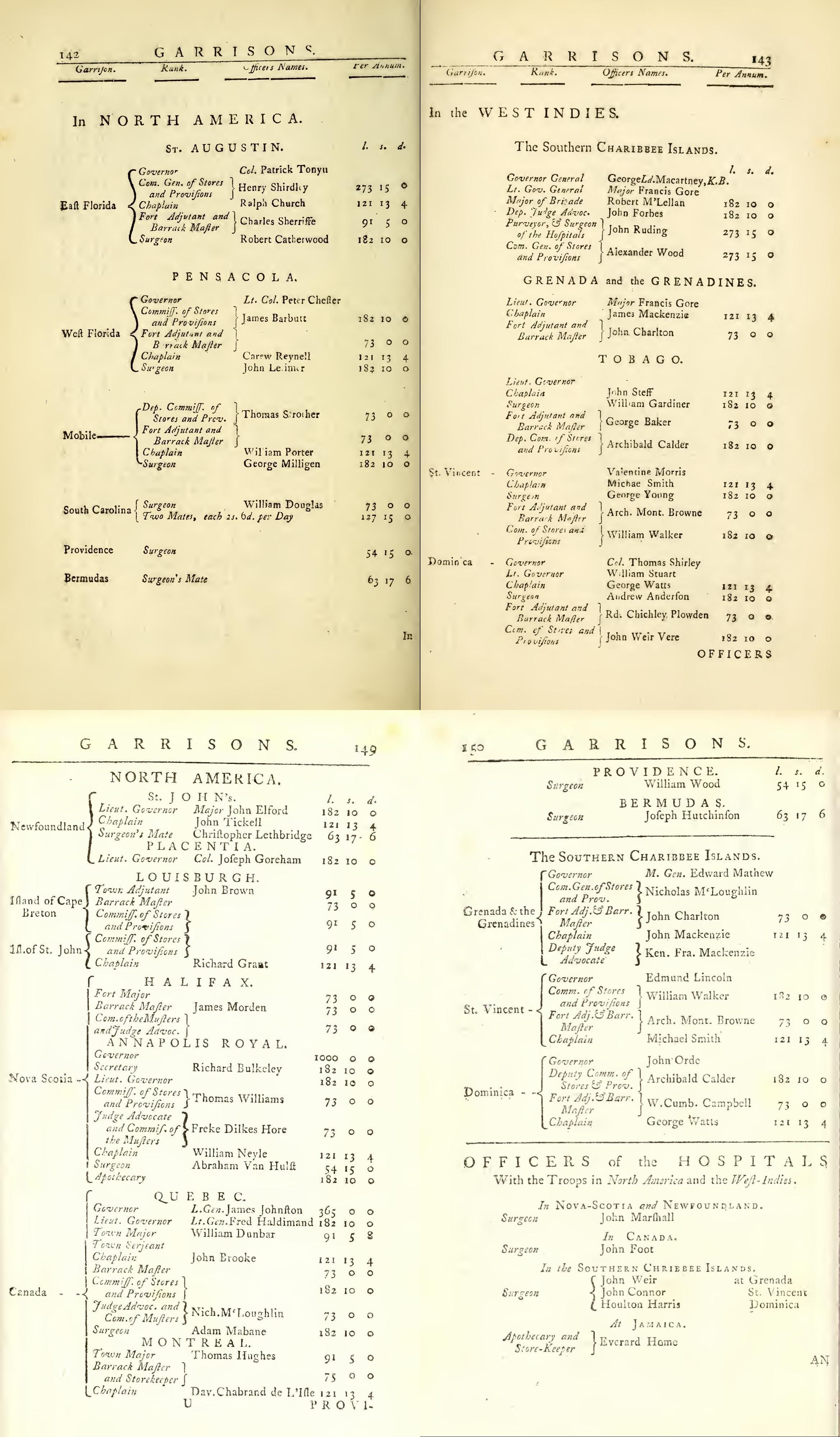
Military Governors and Staff Officers in garrisons of British North America and West Indies 1778 and 1784

The office of Commander-in-Chief, North America was a military position of the British Army. Established in 1755 in the early years of the Seven Years' War, holders of the post were generally responsible for land-based military personnel and activities in and around those parts of North America that Great Britain either controlled or contested. The post continued to exist until 1775, when Lieutenant-General Thomas Gage, the last holder of the post, was replaced early in the American War of Independence. The post's responsibilities were then divided: Major-General William Howe became Commander-in-Chief, America, responsible for British troops from West Florida to Newfoundland, and General Guy Carleton became Commander-in-Chief, Quebec, responsible for the defence of the Province of Quebec.

This division of responsibility persisted after American independence and the loss of East and West Florida in the Treaty of Paris (1783). One officer was given the posting for Quebec, which later became the Commander-in-Chief of The Canadas when Quebec was divided into Upper and Lower Canada, while another officer was posted to Halifax with responsibility for military matters in the maritime provinces.

Prior to 1784, the Bermuda Garrison (an independent company, detached from the 2nd Regiment of Foot, from 1701 to 1763; replaced by a company of the 9th Regiment of Foot detached from Florida along with a detachment from the Bahamas Independent Company until 1768; leaving only the militia until the American War of Independence, when part of the Royal Garrison Battalion had been stationed in Bermuda between 1778 and its disbandment there in 1784; the garrison was permanently re-established by the 47th Regiment of Foot and an invalid company of the Royal Artillery during the French Revolution, along with the establishment of what was to become the Royal Naval Dockyard, Bermuda) had been placed under the military Commander-in-Chief America, but was subsequently to become part of the Nova Scotia Command until the 1860s.

During the War of 1812, Lieutenant-General Sir George Prevost was Captain-General and Governor-in-Chief in and over the Provinces of Upper-Canada, Lower-Canada, Nova-Scotia, and New~Brunswick, and their several Dependencies, Vice-Admiral of the same, Lieutenant-General and Commander of all His Majesty’s Forces in the said Provinces of Lower Canada and Upper-Canada, Nova-Scotia and New-Brunswick, and their several Dependencies, and in the islands of Newfoundland, Prince Edward, Cape Breton and the Bermudas, &c. &c. &c.

Beneath Prevost, the staff of the British Army in the Provinces of Nova-Scotia, New-Brunswick, and their Dependencies, including the Islands of Newfoundland, Cape Breton, Prince Edward and Bermuda were under the Command of Lieutenant-General Sir John Coape Sherbrooke. Below Sherbrooke, the Bermuda Garrison was under the immediate control of the Governor of Bermuda, Major-General George Horsford), New Brunswick was under Major-General George Stracey Smyth, Newfoundland was under Major-General Charles Collins Campbell, and Cape Breton was under Major-General Hugh Swayne.

Following Canadian Confederation in 1867, these commanders were replaced in 1875 by the General Officer Commanding the Forces (Canada), whose post was succeeded in 1904 by the Chief of the General Staff Canada, a position which was established for a Canadian Army commander.

== Commanders-in-Chief, North America 1755–1775 ==
Officer	Start of command	End of command	Notes	Ref
Major-General Edward Braddock	November 1754	July 1755	Braddock's commission was issued in November after word arrived of Lieutenant Colonel George Washington's actions with French forces in the Ohio Country. Braddock was mortally wounded in the Battle of the Monongahela, and died on 13 July 1755.	
Major-General William Shirley	July 1755	1756	Shirley, who was also the royal governor of the Province of Massachusetts Bay, assumed command upon Braddock's death, and had limited military experience. His tenure was marked by failed expeditions on the New York-New France frontier and disagreements with Indian agent William Johnson.	
Major-General John Campbell, 4th Earl of Loudoun	Arrived July 1756	1757	During Loudoun's tenure, thousands of British troops were sent to North America. He was ordered to make a single major expedition, to take the Fortress of Louisbourg. The expedition failed when the French were able to send a fleet to defend the approaches to the fortress. The expedition weakened British forces at Fort William Henry in New York, which fell after a brief siege.	
Major-General James Abercrombie	1757	1758	Abercrombie served as Loudon's second in command in 1757, and was appointed in part for political reasons. Troops and militia numbering more than 45,000 were under his overall command, with three ambitious campaigns planned. Although the British captured Fort Duquesne and Fortress Louisbourg during his tenure, his spectacular failure in the Battle of Carillon led to his recall.	
Lieutenant-General Sir Jeffery Amherst, 1st Baron Amherst	1758	1763	Amherst was the victor in the Siege of Louisbourg. He oversaw the conquest of New France in 1759 and 1760, personally leading forces in the capture of Fort Ticonderoga and the 1760 Battle of the Thousand Islands. He then instituted military rule of the conquered territories, introducing policies concerning Indian relations that led to Pontiac's Rebellion. He has controversially been associated with schemes to deliberately infect Native Americans with smallpox. During his term he also coordinated military efforts in the West Indies in the later years of the Seven Years' War, and organized the successful response to the French seizure of St. John's, Newfoundland.	
Lieutenant-General Thomas Gage	1763	1773	Gage served under Braddock and Abercrombie during the Seven Years' War. He oversaw the military response to Pontiac's Rebellion, and was responsible for implementing official responses to the rising unrest of the American Revolution in the Thirteen Colonies. He returned to England on leave in 1773 without relinquishing the post.	
Major-General Frederick Haldimand (temporary)	1773	1774	Haldimand, a professional officer originally from Switzerland, carefully avoided involving British troops in civil unrest unless specifically requested by local authorities. He also resisted entanglement in the territorial disputes of the New Hampshire Grants, although during his later term as governor of Quebec (1778–1786) he was involved in controversial negotiations over the status of what later became the state of Vermont.	
Lieutenant-General Thomas Gage	1774	1775	Gage returned to North America as Commander-in-Chief and as governor of the Province of Massachusetts Bay, with orders to implement the punitive Intolerable Acts, passed to punish Massachusetts for the Boston Tea Party. Troop movements he ordered in April 1775 led to the Battles of Lexington and Concord and the start of the American Revolutionary War. He was recalled after the British Pyrrhic victory in the Battle of Bunker Hill.	

== Commanders-in-Chief, America 1775–1783 ==
Officer	Start of command	End of command	Notes	Ref
Lieutenant-General Sir William Howe, 5th Viscount Howe	assumed command September 1775	departed May 1778	Howe oversaw the rest of the Siege of Boston, before embarking on a campaign in 1776 that resulted in the capture of New York City and parts of New Jersey. In 1777 he captured Philadelphia, but controversially failed to support John Burgoyne, whose campaign for control of the Hudson River ended in the surrender of his army, leading to the entry of France into the war.	
Lieutenant-General Sir Henry Clinton	arrived May 1778	departed May 1782	Clinton, who had served as second in command to Howe, personally led the withdrawal of British troops from Philadelphia, including the Battle of Monmouth fought en route. He directed the disposition of military troops along all of the frontiers between rebel and Loyal colonies, from West Florida to Nova Scotia. He conducted the successful Siege of Charleston before leaving Major-General Charles, Earl Cornwallis in command of the south. Miscommunication and disagreement between Clinton and both Cornwallis and Admiral Marriot Arbuthnot contributed to British failures that culminated in the 1781 Siege of Yorktown, in which Cornwallis surrendered his army.	
General Guy Carleton	arrived May 1782	departed December 1783	Carleton, who had served as Governor of Quebec early in the war, oversaw the withdrawal of British troops from the United States, and assisted in the relocation of thousands of Loyalists to other parts of the British Empire. Although he indicated a desire to resign in August 1782, his appointed successor, Earl Grey, was withdrawn before his departure when the government in London collapsed.	

== Commanders-in-Chief, Quebec 1775–1791 ==
Officer	Start of command	End of command	Notes	Ref
General Guy Carleton	appointed August 1775	departed 1778		
General Frederick Haldimand	arrived 1778	departed 1786		
General Guy Carleton, 1st Baron Dorchester	appointed April 1786	continued in 1791 as Commander-in-Chief of The Canadas	The second tenure of General Carleton (named Baron Dorchester in August 1786, after his appointment as commander-in-chief and as the first Governor General of The Canadas) was marked by the ongoing consequences of the arrival of needy Loyalist settlers in the provinces. He oversaw the division of Quebec into Upper and Lower Canada and the creation of New Brunswick from Nova Scotian territory, and engaged in prolonged wrangling with the Americans over the continued occupation of frontier forts in the Northwest Territory, whose transfer Carleton oversaw in 1796 after the signing of the Jay Treaty.	

== Commanders-in-Chief of The Canadas, 1791–1864 ==
Officer	Start of command	End of command	Notes	Ref
General Guy Carleton, 1st Baron Dorchester	appointed April 1791	departed July 1796	Carleton during this time engaged in prolonged wrangling with the Americans over the continued occupation of frontier forts in the Northwest Territory, whose transfer Carleton oversaw in 1796 after the signing of the Jay Treaty.	
Lieutenant-General Robert Prescott	appointed December 1796	departed April 1799	Prescott's tenure in North America, which began in April 1796 with appointment as Governor General of The Canadas, was militarily uneventful; in addition to ongoing issues surrounding land grants, he was concerned with intrigues (real and perceived) against British rule by French agitators.	
Lieutenant-General Sir George Prevost	1811	1815	Prevost oversaw the British conduct of the War of 1812 in British North America, for which he was much criticised. Sent to London in 1815 to defend his conduct, he died in 1816 before the court martial was convened.	
Lieutenant-General Sir Gordon Drummond	1815	1816	First Canadian-born Commander-in-Chief and was wounded in the War of 1812 in Upper Canada. During his tenure, Drummond pushed to continue to supply Indigenous peoples in American territories after the war, but was overruled by London.	
Lieutenant-General Sir John Colborne	1836	1839	Colborne, who had previously served a difficult term as governor of Upper Canada (1828–1836), oversaw the official response to the Rebellions of 1837, personally leading forces in the Battle of Saint-Eustache.	
Lieutenant-General Sir Richard Downes Jackson	1839	1845	During Jackson's tenure, there was tension with the United States over a variety of border disputes, with significant tensions on the disputed Maine-New Brunswick frontier. This led to a rise in troop strength in North America to about 12,000; the disputes were peacefully resolved with the Webster-Ashburton Treaty in 1842. He died quite unexpectedly shortly before the arrival of his replacement, Earl Cathcart.	
General Charles Cathcart, 2nd Earl Cathcart	1845	1847	Cathcart was appointed first as commander-in-chief and later also governor-general amid tensions between Britain and the United States over the Oregon Country. These were resolved peacefully with the signing in 1846 of the Oregon Treaty. When a new governor-general was appointed, Cathcart resigned both his positions.	
Lieutenant-General Sir Benjamin D'Urban	1847	1849		
Lieutenant-General Sir William Rowan	1849	1855	Rowan, who had served as an aide to Colborne during his tenure in the post, had a largely uneventful time in office. The only major incident was rioting in Montreal that led to the burning of the Parliament buildings there.	
Lieutenant-General Sir William Eyre	1855	1859		
Lieutenant-General Sir William Williams	1859	1864	Appointed to the post when North-South tensions rose in the United States, Williams oversaw defensive arrangements to prevent the American Civil War from spilling into British territories. A diplomatic incident known as the Trent Affair in 1861 led to an increase in the troop strength in the British provinces, and Williams made vigorous preparations for war before the crisis subsided.	

== Commanders-in-Chief, maritime provinces, 1783–1875 ==
Officer	Start of command	End of command	Notes	Ref
Major-General John Campbell	December 1783	April 1786		
General Prince Edward, Duke of Kent and Strathearn	arrived September 1799	departed August 1800	Kent's tenure was short. The fourth son of King George III, he had been given command of the Halifax station in 1794, at which time he embarked on a major programme to upgrade the city's defences. He was appointed commander-in-chief upon Prescott's recall, but illness cut short his tenure.	
Lieutenant-General Sir John Coape Sherbrooke	arrived 16 October 1811	departed 1816	Sherbrooke led the successful defence of the Maritimes during the American War of 1812.	

== See also ==
- North America and West Indies Station
- Commander-in-Chief, North American Station
