= Charles Cathcart, 8th Lord Cathcart =

British army officer (1686–1740)

Major-General The Lord Cathcart
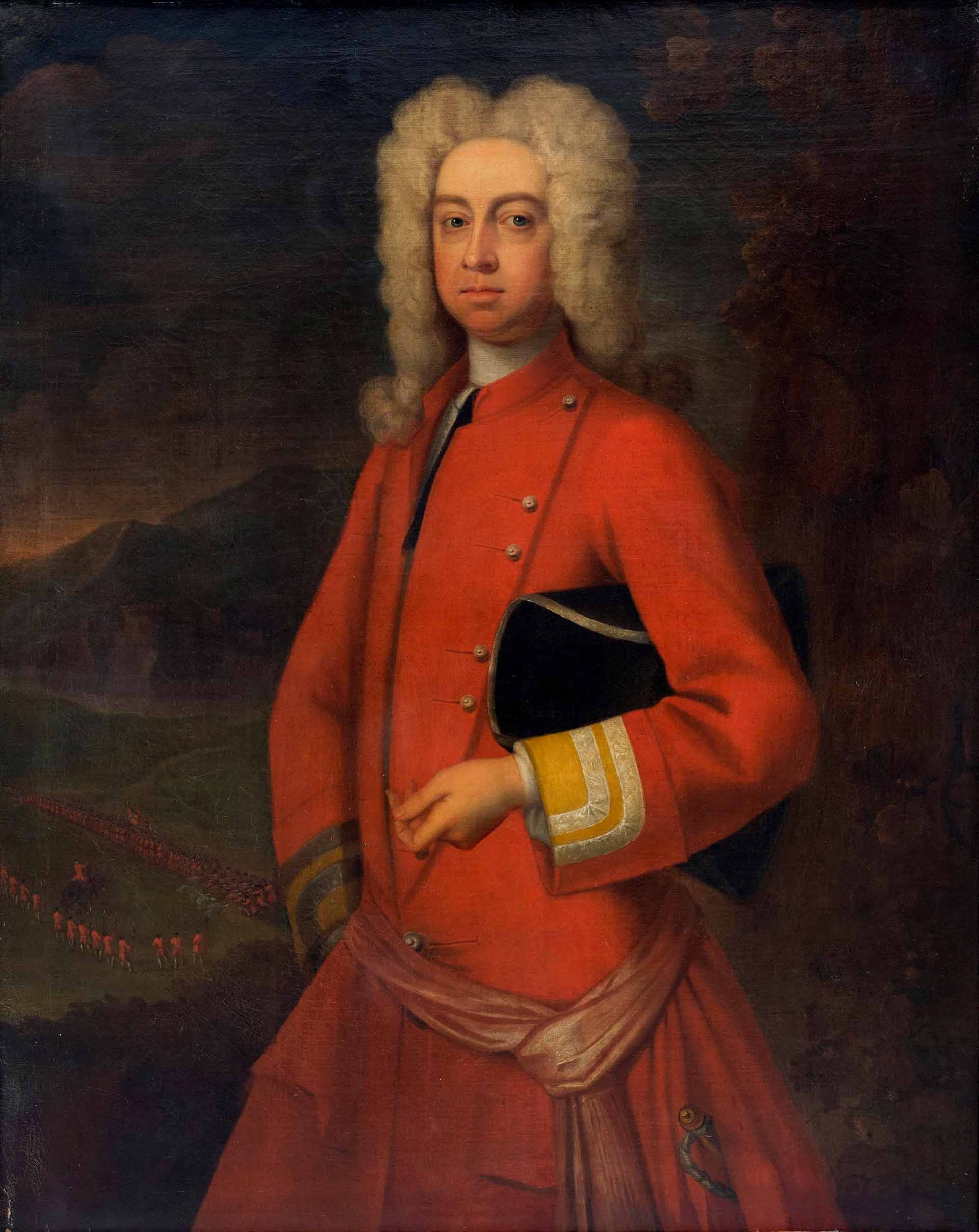
- Portrait by Jonathan Richardson, c. 1733
- Born: 1686
- Died: 20 December 1740 (aged 53–54)

Charles Cathcart, 8th Lord Cathcart (1686 – 20 December 1740) was a British army officer.

== Family ==
He was the second son of Alan Cathcart, 7th Lord Cathcart by his wife Elizabeth, daughter of James Dalrymple, 1st Viscount of Stair. His elder brother Alan died at sea in 1699.

== Career ==
=== Military career ===
Cathcart joined the Scots Army at the age of seventeen, and in 1704 he commanded a company in George Macartney's regiment (later disbanded) serving against the French on the frontiers of Holland. In 1706 he commanded a troop in the Scots Greys, which corps distinguished itself at the decisive Battle of Ramillies in the same year; and in 1707 he was brigade-major to the Earl of Stair. Continuing in active service after the Scots Army was merged with the English Army to form the British Army, Captain Cathcart was at most of the general actions fought by the army commanded by the Duke of Marlborough, acquiring the reputation of a brave and zealous officer. In 1709 he was appointed major of the Scots Greys and shortly afterwards obtained the lieutenant-colonelcy of the regiment.

In autumn 1715, on the breaking out of the rebellion of the Earl of Mar, Cathcart joined the forces under the Duke of Argyll at Stirling. On 23 October he detached with a party of dragoons against a body of rebels consisting of one hundred horse and two hundred foot, with whom he came up at five o'clock on the following morning and attacked and defeated them, killing many and capturing seventeen prisoners. He was also at the Battle of Sheriffmuir on 13 November, in the same year, and by a prompt attack on the enemy's flank with the Scots Greys under his command, contributed materially to the overthrow of the left wing of the rebel army. He was rewarded with the colonelcy of the 9th Foot on 15 February 1717, but he only retained the appointment eleven months.

On 13 August 1728 Cathcart obtained the colonelcy of the 31st Regiment, and was removed to the 8th Dragoons on 1 January 1731. On 7 August 1733 he was made colonel of the 7th Horse (later 6th Dragoon Guards); in 1735 he was promoted to the rank of brigadier-general, and in 1739 to that of major-general. In 1740, when it was resolved to attack the Spanish possessions in America, Lord Cathcart was selected to command the expedition and was appointed commander-in-chief in America, but he died on his passage on 20 December 1740 and was buried on the beach at Portsmouth, Dominica, where a monument was erected to his memory.

=== At court ===
On the accession of King George II in 1727 he was appointed a Groom of the Bedchamber in the royal household. In 1732 he succeeded to the title of Lord Cathcart, and he was appointed lord of the bedchamber to King George II in 1733. Lord Cathcart was chosen one of the representatives of the Scottish peerage in several parliaments, and was governor of Duncannon Fort and of Londonderry.

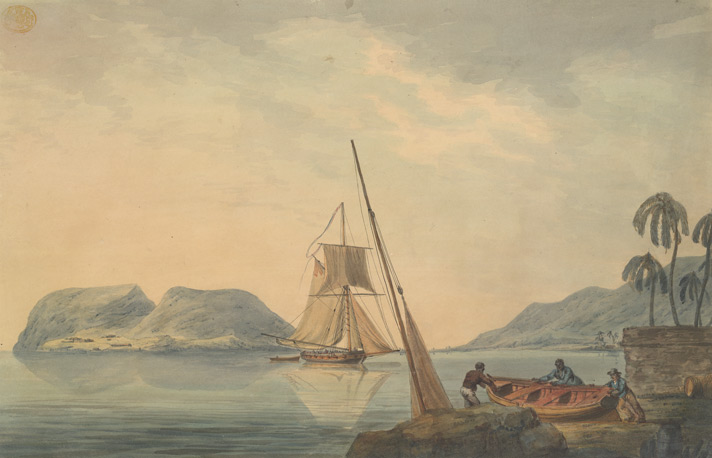
Prince Rupert's Head (Fort Shirley) and Bay in the Island of Dominique from near the tomb

Military offices
Preceded by James Campbell	Colonel of Cathcart's Regiment of Foot; 1717–1718	Succeeded by James Otway
Preceded by Lord John Kerr	Colonel of Cathcart's Regiment of Foot; 1728–1731	Succeeded by William Hargrave
Preceded by Sir Robert Rich	Colonel of Cathcart's Regiment of Dragoons; 1731–1733	Succeeded by Sir Adolphus Oughton
Preceded by Sir Robert Rich	Colonel of His Majesty's 1st Regiment of Carabiniers; 1733–1740	Succeeded by Phineas Bowles
Preceded by Philip Honywood	Governor of Duncannon Fort; 1735–1740	Succeeded by Gervais Parker
Preceded by Thomas Pearce	Governor of Londonderry; 1739–1740	Succeeded by Henry Cornewall
Peerage of Scotland
Preceded by Alan Cathcart	Lord Cathcart; 1732–1740	Succeeded by Charles Cathcart
