= William Cathcart, 1st Earl Cathcart =

British Army officer and diplomat (1755–1843)

General The Right Honourable The Earl Cathcart KT PC PC (Ire)
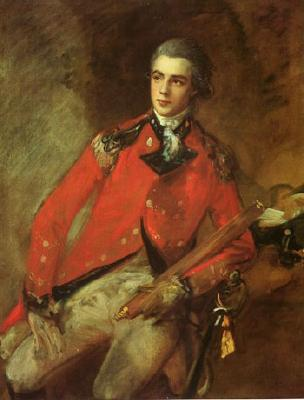
- Portrait, 1780
- Born: 17 September 1755; Petersham, London
- Died: 16 June 1843 (aged 87); Glasgow, Scotland
- Military career
- Allegiance: Great Britain; United Kingdom
- Branch: British Army
- Rank: General
- Nickname: Cath
- Commands: Commander-in-Chief, Scotland; Commander-in-Chief, Ireland
- Conflicts: American Revolutionary War; Battle of Monmouth; Napoleonic Wars; Battle of Copenhagen
- Awards: Knight of the Order of the Thistle; Order of St. Andrew (Russia); Order of St. George of the Fourth Degree (Russia)

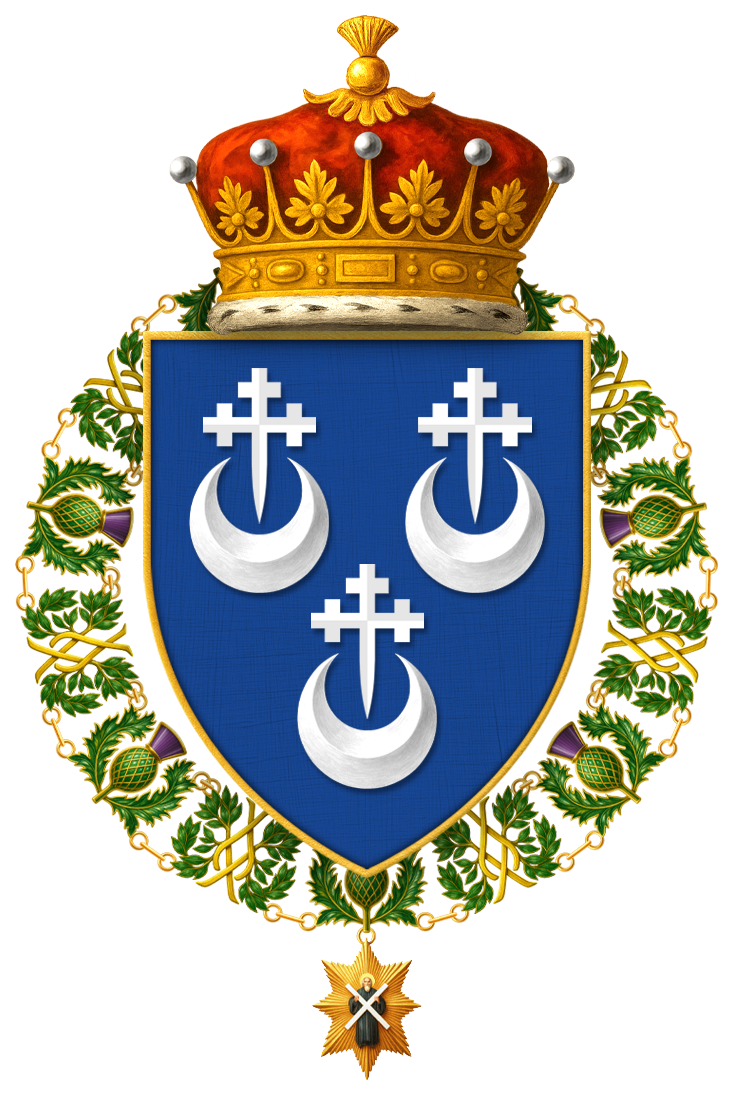
Shield of Arms of William Schaw Cathcart, 1st Earl Cathcart, KT

General William Schaw Cathcart, 1st Earl Cathcart, KT, PC, PC (Ire) (17 September 1755 – 16 June 1843) was a British Army officer and diplomat who served as the British ambassador to Russia from 1805 to 1806 and 1812 to 1820.

== Early life ==
Cathcart born at Petersham, London, on 17 September 1755, and educated at Eton College. He was the son of Charles Cathcart, 9th Lord Cathcart and his wife Ann Hamilton.

== Military career ==
In 1771 he went to St. Petersburg, where his father, Charles Cathcart, 9th Lord Cathcart, a general in the army, was ambassador. He became an excellent horseman in Russia then from 1773 to 1777 he studied law at the University of Glasgow and was afterwards called to the Scottish Bar. He succeeded to the lordship upon his father's death in 1776, and inherited several properties including Schawpark an estate near Sauchie where his father had commissioned Robert Adam to remodel the mansion house but the works were incomplete when his father died.

In 1777 he obtained a commission in the 7th Dragoons. Proceeding to America in 1777, he had before the close of his first campaign twice won promotion on the field of battle. He transferred to the 17th Light Dragoons. In 1778 he further distinguished himself in outpost work, and at the Battle of Monmouth he commanded the British Legion, with conspicuous success; for a time also he acted as quartermaster-general to the forces in America. He returned home in 1780, and in February 1781 was made captain and lieutenant colonel in the Coldstream Guards.

In September 1784 Cathcart organised the first formal cricket match in Scotland, in the grounds of Schawpark and commissioned a family portrait by David Allan to commemorate the event.

He was elected a Scottish representative peer in 1788, and in 1792 he became colonel of the 29th Foot. He served with distinction in the campaigns in the Low Countries, 1793–1795, in the course of which he was promoted major general; and in 1801 he was made a lieutenant general, having in the meanwhile received the appointments of Vice Admiral of Scotland (1795), privy councillor (1798), and colonel of the 2nd Life Guards (1797).

From 1803 to 1805 Lord Cathcart was Commander-in-Chief in Ireland, and in the latter year he was sent by Pitt to supersede Sir George Don in command of the 14,000 strong British Hanover Expedition. He occupied Hanover on 14 December and joined with Werdereffsky's Russian column of Tolstoi's corps. After skirmishes with the French forces of Gabriel Barbou des Courières at Springe, Cathcart was forced to withdraw after the Franco-Prussian agreement of 27 January 1806 handing over Hanover to Prussia, and re-embarked for the United Kingdom on 7 February 1806.

After the recall of this expedition Cathcart commanded the forces in Scotland until 1807, when he was placed in charge of the expedition to Copenhagen, which surrendered to him on 6 September. Four weeks later he was created Viscount Cathcart of Cathcart and Baron Greenock of Greenock in the peerage of the United Kingdom, resuming the Scottish command on his return from the front.

On 1 January 1812 he was promoted to the full rank of general, and a few months later he proceeded to Russia as ambassador and military commissioner. In the latter capacity he served with the headquarters of the allies throughout the War of Liberation (1812–1814); his success in the delicate and difficult task of maintaining harmony and devotion to the common cause amongst the generals of many nationalities was recognized after the war by his elevation to an earldom (July 1814). He then went to St. Petersburg, and continued to hold the post of ambassador. During this time, Cathcart participated in the Congress of Vienna. He held the role of ambassador until 1820, when he returned to his home in Britain.

He died at his estate near Glasgow on 16 June 1843. He is buried in Paisley Abbey with a monument by William Mossman erected in 1848.

== Family ==
on 10 April 1779, Cathcart married Elizabeth Elliot, the daughter of the lieutenant-governor of New York, Andrew Elliot (son Sir Gilbert Elliot, 2nd Baronet, of Minto and uncle to 1st Earl of Minto) at New York. The couple had ten children, the first five being born in the 1780s. Their first child, Louisa, was born in New York on 25 January 1780, but died soon after her birth. Other children included the army officers Sir George Cathcart and Sir Charles Cathcart, both of whom became generals, the latter inheriting the peerage on his father's death.

William's first-born son, William Cathcart, entered the Royal Navy but died of yellow fever in 1804 while in command of his ship HMS Clorinde.

Cathcart took two of his sons with him during his appointment as ambassador to Russia, Captain Frederick Macadam Cathcart served as his private secretary and Lieutenant George Cathcart functioned as his aide-de-camp. Cathcart's last son, Adolphus Frederick Cathcart, was born on 28 June 1803.

== See also ==
- List of ships named Lord Cathcart

Honorary titles
New office	Lord Lieutenant of Clackmannanshire; 1794–1798	Succeeded by Sir Ralph Abercromby
Preceded by Sir Ralph Abercromby	Lord Lieutenant of Clackmannanshire; 1801–1803	Succeeded by The Earl of Mansfield
Military offices
Preceded by The Lord William Gordon	Vice-Admiral of Scotland; 1795–1843	Vacant
Preceded by The Lord Amherst	Colonel of the 2nd Regiment of Life Guards; 1797–1843	Succeeded by The Marquess of Londonderry
Preceded by Charles Stanhope	Colonel of the 29th (Worcestershire) Regiment of Foot; 1792–1797	Succeeded by Gordon Forbes
Preceded by Henry Fox	Commander-in-Chief, Ireland; 1803–1806	Succeeded by The Earl of Harrington
Preceded by The Earl of Moira	Commander-in-Chief, Scotland; 1806–1812	Succeeded by Henry Wynyard
Preceded by The Lord Hill	Governor of Kingston-upon-Hull; 1830–1843	Office abolished
Peerage of the United Kingdom
New creation	Earl Cathcart; 1814–1843	Succeeded by Charles Cathcart
New creation	Viscount Cathcart; 1807–1843	Succeeded by Charles Cathcart
Peerage of Scotland
Preceded by Charles Cathcart	Lord Cathcart; 1776–1843	Succeeded by Charles Cathcart
