= Charles Cathcart, 2nd Earl Cathcart =

British Army general and governor in Canada (1783–1859)

General The Right Honorable The Earl Cathcart GCB FRSE
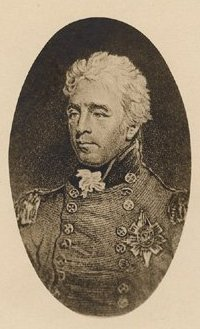
- Lord Cathcart

Governor General of the Province of Canada
- In office 1846–1847
- Monarch: Victoria
- Preceded by: The Lord Metcalfe
- Succeeded by: The Earl of Elgin

Personal details
- Born: 21 December 1783 Walton, Essex, England
- Died: 16 July 1859 (aged 75) St Leonards-on-Sea, England
- Awards: Knight Grand Cross of the Order of the Bath; Order of St. Vladimir, 4th Class (Russia); Knight Fourth Class of the Military William Order (Netherlands)

Military service
- Allegiance: United Kingdom
- Branch/service: British Army
- Years of service: 1800–1855
- Rank: General
- Commands: Northern District (1850–1855); Commander-in-Chief, North America (1846–1847); Commander-in-Chief, Scotland (1837–1842)
- Battles/wars: War of the Fifth Coalition; Walcheren Campaign; Peninsular War; Battle of Barrosa; Battle of Salamanca; Battle of Vitoria; War of the Seventh Coalition; Battle of Waterloo

General Charles Murray Cathcart, 2nd Earl Cathcart, GCB, FRSE (21 December 1783 – 16 July 1859), styled Lord Greenock between 1814 and 1843, was a British Army general who became Governor General of the Province of Canada (26 November 1845 – 30 January 1847). He was a keen amateur geologist, with enough recognition to warrant being made a Fellow of the Royal Society of Edinburgh.

== Early life ==
Cathcart was born at Walton, Essex, on 21 December 1783, the eldest surviving son of William Cathcart, 10th Lord Cathcart (later the 1st Earl Cathcart).

== Career ==
Cathcart entered the army as a cornet in the 2nd Regiment of Life Guards on 2 March 1800. He served on the staff of Sir James Craig in Naples and Sicily. He became heir apparent to the lordship of Cathcart in 1804, after his brother William Cathcart, Master of Cathcart died while commanding a Royal Navy vessel in the West Indies. After his father was elevated to an earldom in 1814 he became known by the courtesy title Lord Greenock.

Cathcart saw service on the ill-fated Walcheren Expedition in 1809 and at the siege of Flushing, after which for some time he was disabled by the injurious effects of the pestilence which cut off so many thousands of his companions. Becoming lieutenant colonel on 30 August 1810, he embarked for the Peninsula, where he was present at the Battle of Barrosa, for which he received a gold medal on 6 April 1812, at the Battle of Salamanca, and the Battle of Vitoria, during which he served as assistant quartermaster-general.

He was next sent to assist Sir Thomas Graham in Holland as the head of the quartermaster-general's staff and was present at the ill-fated Siege of Bergen op Zoom in March 1814. Thereafter he was present at the Battle of Waterloo, where he had three horses shot from under him. He was awarded the Russian Order of St. Vladimir, the Dutch Military William Order, and made a Companion of the Order of the Bath (CB). In 1823, he was appointed a lieutenant colonel in the royal staff corps at Hythe.

In 1830 he moved to Edinburgh where lived at "Whitehouse villa" on Bruntsfield Links. He became involved in the proceedings of the Highland Society, became a Fellow of the Royal Society of Edinburgh and where he announced the discovery of a new mineral, a sulphide of cadmium, which was found in excavating the Bishopton tunnel near Port Glasgow and which is now known as Greenockite. On 17 February 1837 he was made Commander-in-Chief, Scotland and Governor of Edinburgh Castle. On 17 June 1838, on the death of his father, he became second earl and eleventh baron Cathcart. On 16 March 1846 he was appointed commander-in-chief in British North America from 16 March 1846 and in 1850 he was appointed to the command of the Northern and Midland District, and in 1855 he retired.

== Family ==
On 30 September 1818 he married Henrietta Mather, daughter of Thomas Mather in France. The couple remarried at Portsea, England, 12 February 1819. Lady Cathcart accompanied her husband, and their daughters, to Canada in June, 1845. Lady Cathcart presented colours to one of the militia regiments in Montreal. The family returned to England in May, 1847. His daughter Elizabeth married General Sir John Douglas.

Cathcart died at St. Leonard's-on-Sea on 16 July 1859. His wife died on 24 June 1872.

== Publications ==
He was the author of two papers in the Transactions of the Royal Society of Edinburgh in 1836, On the Phenomena in the neighbourhood of Edinburgh of the Igneous Rocks in their relation to the Secondary Strata, and The Coal Formation of the Scottish Lowlands.

== Sources ==
- Boase, George Clement (1887). "Cathcart, Charles Murray" . In Stephen, Leslie (ed.). Dictionary of National Biography. Vol. 9. London: Smith, Elder & Co. p. 285.
- Cooke, O.A.; Hillmer, Norman (1985). "Murray, Charles, 2nd Earl Cathcart". In Halpenny, Francess G. (ed.). Dictionary of Canadian Biography. Vol. VIII (1851–1860) (online ed.). University of Toronto Press.

Military offices
Preceded by Sir William Lumley	Colonel of the 1st (King's) Dragoon Guards; 1851–1859	Succeeded by Sir Thomas Brotherton
Preceded by Sir Thomas Arbuthnot	GOC Northern District; 1850–1855	Succeeded by Sir Harry Smith
Preceded by Francis Newbery	Colonel of the 3rd (Prince of Wales's) Dragoon Guards; 1847–1851	Succeeded by James Claud Bourchier
Preceded by Sir Richard Downes Jackson	Commander-in-Chief, North America; 1846–1847	Succeeded by Sir Benjamin D'Urban
Preceded by Sir Arthur Clifton	Colonel of the 11th (Prince Albert's Own); Regiment of (Light) Dragoons (Hussars); 1842–1847	Succeeded by Sir Henry Wyndham
Preceded by Hon. Patrick Stuart	Commander-in-Chief, Scotland; 1837–1842	Succeeded by Sir Neil Douglas
Preceded by Hon. Patrick Stuart	Governor of Edinburgh Castle; 1837–1842	Succeeded by Sir Neil Douglas
Political offices
Preceded by The Lord Metcalfe	Governor General of the Province of Canada; 1846–1847	Succeeded by The Earl of Elgin
Academic offices
Preceded by The Lord Metcalfe	Chancellor of King's College; 1846–1847	Succeeded by The Earl of Elgin
Peerage of the United Kingdom
Preceded by William Cathcart	Earl Cathcart; 1843–1859	Succeeded by Alan Cathcart
