= Cathcart (surname) =

Cathcart is a Surname of Scottish origin. Notable people with the surname include:

- Anna Cathcart (born 2003), Canadian actress
- Brian Cathcart (born 1956), Irish-born journalist, academic and media campaigner
- Bryan Cathcart (1896–1979), Canadian politician
- Charles Allan Cathcart (1759–1788), British noble and politician
- Charles Walker Cathcart (1853–1932), Scottish surgeon
- Charles W. Cathcart (1809–1888), US Senator
- Clare Cathcart (1965–2014), Northern Irish actress
- Craig Cathcart (born 1989), Northern Irish footballer
- Daniel B. Cathcart (1906–1959), American art director
- Dick Cathcart (1924–1993), American trumpet player
- Edward Provan Cathcart (1877–1954), Scottish physiologist
- Emily Gordon Cathcart (1845–1932), British landowner
- Fanny Cathcart (1833–1880), Australian actress
- Frederick Cathcart (1859–1934), British impresario
- George Cathcart (1794–1854), British soldier and diplomat
- Ian Cathcart (born 1982), New Zealand basketball player and coach
- Isaac Cathcart (1845–1909), Irish-American businessman
- James Cathcart (disambiguation) several people:
  - James Carter Cathcart (1954–2025), American voice actor
  - James Faucett Cathcart (1827–1902), English actor in Australia
  - James Leander Cathcart (1767–1843), diplomat, slave, and sailor
- Jane Cathcart (1726–1771), wife of Charles Cathcart, 9th Lord Cathcart
- Jane R. Cathcart (1874–1947), American clubwoman
- J. F. Cathcart (1827–1902), English actor
- Jim Cathcart, American entrepreneur, speaker and author
- Mary Cathcart (born 1942), American politician
- Richard Cathcart (born 1943), American geographer
- Richard C. Cathcart, American politician
- Royal Cathcart (1926–2012), American football player
- Sam Cathcart (1924–2015), American football player
- Timothy Cathcart (1994–2014), Northern Irish rally driver
- William Cathcart (Royal Navy officer) (1782–1804), British Royal Navy officer

== See also ==
- Earl of Cathcart
