= Cathcart (disambiguation) =

Cathcart may refer to:

== Places ==
- Cathcart, a place in Glasgow, Scotland
- Cathcart, Eastern Cape, South Africa
- Cathcart (Indianapolis, Indiana), listed on the NRHP in Indiana
- Cathcart, Washington, United States
- Cathcart, New South Wales, Australia
- Cathcart, Victoria, Australia

== People ==
- Cathcart (surname)
- Andrew Cathcart Bogle (1829–1890), British recipient of the Victoria Cross
- Cathcart Wason (1848–1921), New Zealand and Scotland politician

Nobles

- Earl Cathcart, a title in the peerage of the United Kingdom
- Charles Cathcart, 2nd Earl Cathcart, Governor General of Canada
- Charles Cathcart, 9th Lord Cathcart, British soldier and politician
- William Cathcart, 1st Earl Cathcart, Scottish soldier and diplomat

Family

- Clan Cathcart

== Other ==
- Colonel Cathcart, a fictional character in Catch-22
- Glasgow Cathcart (disambiguation), the name of two British political constituencies
- Cathcart Circle Lines, a railway route in Scotland
- Cath cart, informal name for catheterization supply cart in hospitals (parallel to "crash cart" for emergency/life support supply cart)
