= William Cathcart =

William Cathcart may refer to:

- William Cathcart, 1st Earl Cathcart (1755–1843), Scottish soldier and diplomat
- William Cathcart (Royal Navy officer) (1782–1804), officer in the Royal Navy during the French Revolutionary and Napoleonic Wars

== See also ==
- Cathcart (surname)
