= William Jolly (disambiguation) =

William Jolly was an Australian politician.

William Jolly or Jolley may also refer to:

- William Jolly (Leicester MP) represented Leicester (UK Parliament constituency)
- Willie Jolley, motivational speaker, entrepreneur and author
