= French period =

Old term for the 1794–1815 period of French domination in Europe

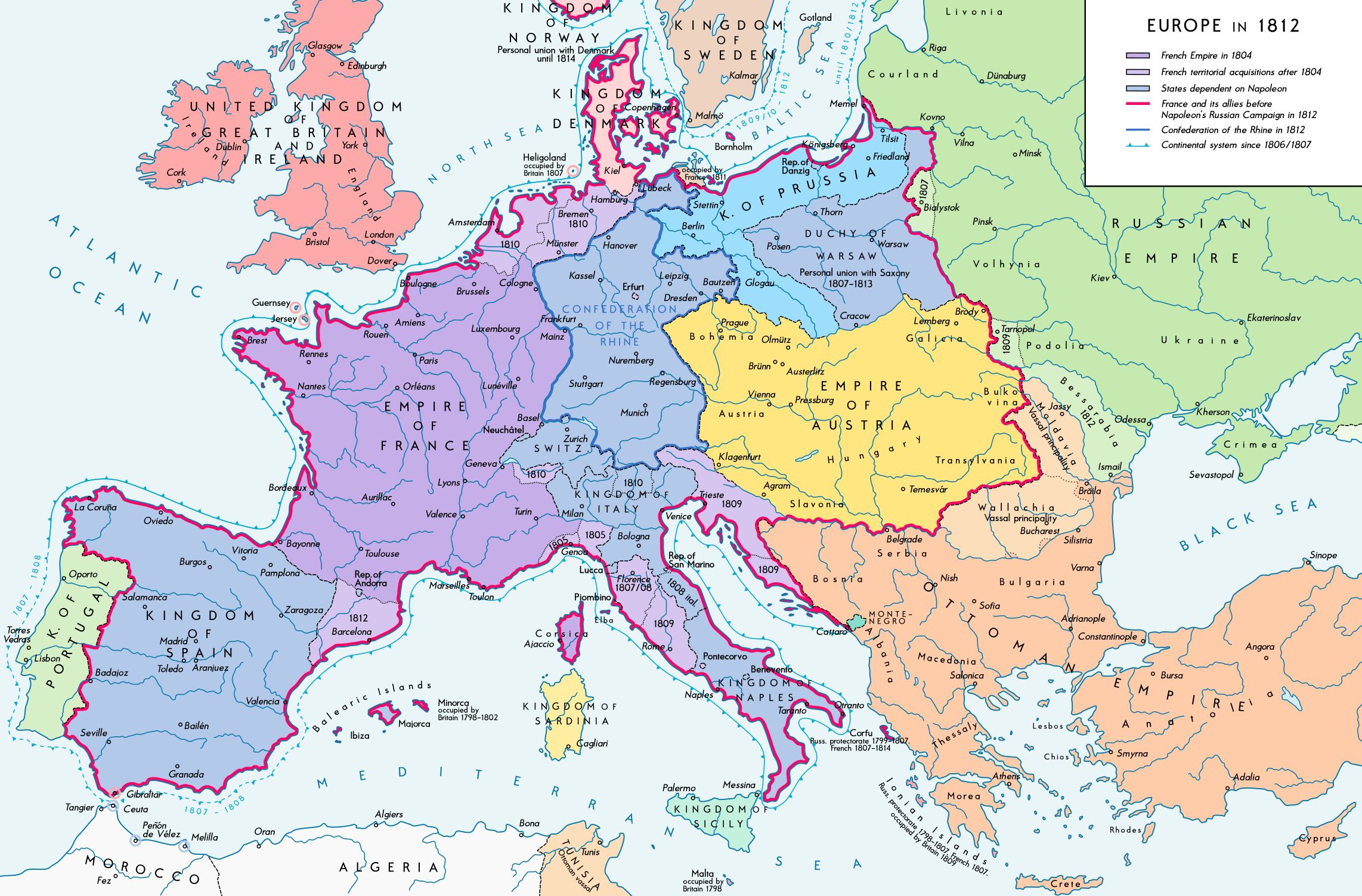
The French Empire and client states in 1812. French Empire in 1804 French acquisitions after 1804 Satellite states French sphere of influence

In European historiography, the term French period (French: Période française, German: Franzosenzeit, Dutch: Franse tijd) refers to the period between 1794 and 1815 during which most of Western Europe was controlled by Republican or Napoleonic France. The exact duration of the period varies by the location concerned. A related term in English-language historiography is the Napoleonic era.

In German historiography, the term emerged in the 19th century and developed nationalist connotations. It entered Low German usage with Fritz Reuter's popular work Ut de Franzosentid (1860). It was used alongside the concept of Erbfeind ("hereditary enemy") to express anti-French feeling as part of the formation of a German national identity and as such was used in a non-neutral way under the German Empire and Third Reich. In Germany, the term has thus been shunned since the Bonn Republic, with "French Revolutionary Wars" and "Napoleonic Wars" more commonly used today.

== History ==
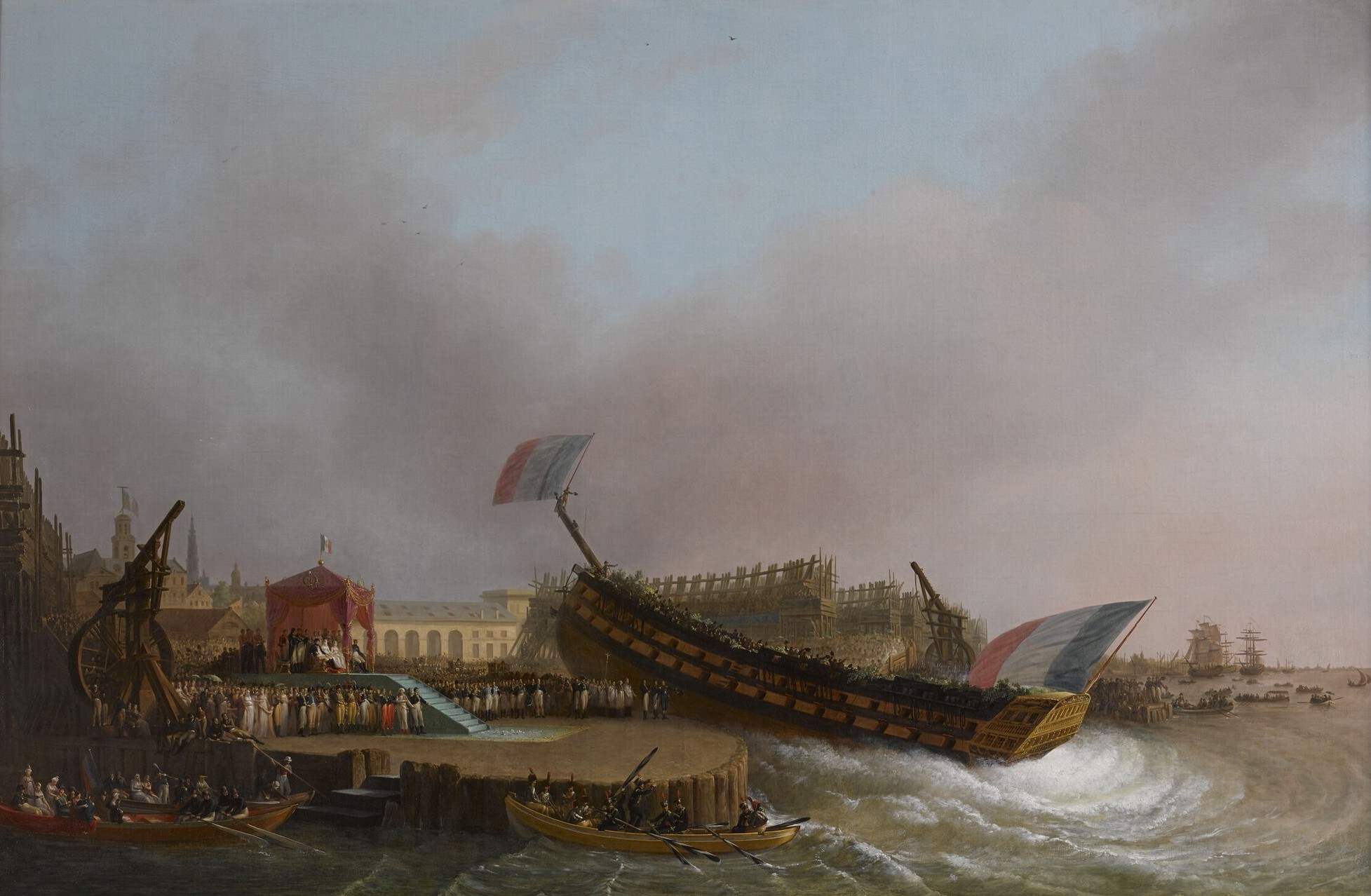
The Emperor Napoleon attending the launch of the Friedland in Antwerp, modern-day Belgium, in 1810

Following the Battle of Austerlitz and the War of the Third Coalition, Napoleon dissolved the Holy Roman Empire, annexed parts of Austria and certain German states to France, and formed the German states into the Confederation of the Rhine. Napoleon was their "protector," but as the Confederation was above all a military alliance, their foreign policy was utterly dominated by France, and the states had to supply France with large numbers of military troops. Disquiet about mass-conscription (the levée en masse) also trigged an uprising, known as the Peasants' War, in 1798 within modern-day Belgium and Luxembourg. In Germany, Napoleon formed two new states, the Grand Duchy of Berg and the Kingdom of Westphalia, which he gave to his general Joachim Murat and his brother Jerome Bonaparte, respectively. The Austrian Netherlands and Prince-Bishopric of Liège were annexed and became départements of France.

During the French occupation, the Napoleonic Code was introduced, during which the German people came into contact with the ideals of the French Revolution, including nationalism. In Prussia, which was not part of the French-dominated Confederation of the Rhine, but still occupied by France, this created a dynamic towards constitutional, political, social, and military reform which would prove critical during the Liberation War. In the Confederation itself, there were already riots against the French rule, and after the devastation of the French army during the French invasion of Russia, the commander of the Prussian Corps, Yorck, signed a ceasefire with Russia. This was to be the decisive trigger of the Liberation War.

== Results ==
The French period contributed significantly to the emergence of the idea of unity and national consciousness in Germany. The many regions with their various dialects found in the struggle against the French occupation "German" as a common definition of anti-French sentiment or freedom. After the Vormärz period, the desire for freedom from the government was suppressed, until the March Revolution in 1848 and the formation of the first German parliament, though not all German-speaking territories were involved. In the Prussian War of Liberation conscription modeled after the levée en masse of General Gerhard von Scharnhorst was introduced and the Prussian army reforms introduced. The Prussian reforms (1807–1812) during the French period include not only the formal abolition of the Holy Roman Empire in 1806 but also the largest political and social upheavals between the Early Modern Period and the Modern Period in Germany. With the abandonment of Francis II from the Holy Roman Empire to the Austrian Empire, there was also created a political split between Prussia and Austria, which laid the ground for Austrian exclusion from the German Question.
