= HMS Renard (1797) =

Sloop of the Royal Navy

History

France
- Name: Renard
- Namesake: The fox, an animal of the genus Vulpes
- Builder: Bordeaux or Lorient
- Launched: 1797
- Captured: 1797

Great Britain
- Name: HMS Renard
- Acquired: By capture 1797
- Fate: Sold 1809

General characteristics
- Type: Sloop
- Tons burthen: 345 57/94 bm
- Length: 103 ft 1 in (31.4 m) (overall); 81 ft 5 in (24.8 m) (keel)
- Beam: 28 ft 3 in (8.6 m)
- Depth of hold: 11 ft 6 1/2 in (3.5 m)
- Complement: French service: 189; British service: 90
- Armament: French service: 18 × 6-pounder guns; British service (initial): 16 × 32-pounder carronades; Forecastle: 2 × 6-pounder guns; British service (after 1799): 16 × 32-pounder carronades; Quarterdeck: 6 × 18-pounder carronades; Forecastle: 2 × 6-pounder guns 2 × 18-pounder carronades

HMS Renard was the French privateer Renard, launched in 1797, that Cerberus captured in the Channel that same year. The Royal Navy took her into service under her existing name and she participated in some notable engagements on the Jamaica station before the Navy sold her in 1809.

== Capture ==
Cerberus was on the Irish station when on 12 and 14 November 1797 she captured two French privateers, the Epervier and the Renard. Both vessels were pierced for 20 guns, were copper-bottomed, quite new, and fast sailers. Renard carried eighteen 6-pounders and had a crew of 189 men. Lloyd's List reported Cerberus's capture of two privateers, one of 30 guns and one of 18, and the arrival of both at Cork. The Royal Navy took both into service, though it never actually commissioned Epervier, which was frequently listed as Epervoir.

== Career ==
Renard arrived in Plymouth on 12 January 1799. She sat there for six months, finally undergoing fitting between July 1799 and January 1800. While undergoing fitting she may have received additional cannons and extensive upperworks to hold them. There is some question though whether she in fact received the additional armament and upperworks (see below). Commander Peter Spicer commissioned Renard in August 1799 for the Channel.

Renard shared in the recapture of the brig Defiance on 13 December 1800 with Suffisante, Spitfire, and the hired armed cutter Swift (2). Twelve days later, Renard and Spitfire captured the Danish galliot Palmboom (or Palm Baum). Then on 29 December Renard captured Neptunus.

In April 1801 Commander James A. Worth replaced Spicer. Renard, Dasher, and Suffisante were in company for the recapture of the brig William on 3 April 1801. On 1 April a French privateer Renard had captured William, Wedland, master, which had been sailing from Bristol to Newfoundland. Dasher sent William into Plymouth. Also on 3 April, Renard, Suffisante, and Garland shared in the recapture of the brig Swan.

Renard and Spitfire shared in the capture on 24 April of Prince Hendrich. The next day they captured Prince Frederick Van Prussia.

In May 1802 Commander Charles M. Gregory assumed command, and that same month sailed Renard for the Leeward Islands. Commander Robert Pearson replaced Gregory, only to be himself replaced in October by Commander William Cathcart. Reports in Lloyd's List of ship arrivals and departures make it clear that between 1803 and 1804 Renard convoyed vessels between Britain and the Leeward Islands.

Cathcart received promotion to post captain in June 1804 and with it command of Clorinde, however he died of yellow fever before fully taking command. His replacement on Renard was Commander Jeremiah Coghlan.

On 20 March 1805 Renard was at 21°14′N 71°30′W when she sighted a ship to the north-west. Renard gave chase and as she approached, her quarry shortened sail and made ready to engage. At 2:20 p.m., Renard opened fire. After 35 minutes, the French vessel appeared to be on fire, and ten minutes later she exploded. Renard lowered a boat and was able to rescue 55 men, all the rest of the 160 men aboard having perished. She had been under the command of Paul Gerard Pointe, and was seven days out of Basseterre. She had intended to intercept the homeward-bound Jamaica fleet. The survivors reported that their vessel was the Général Ernouf. Général Ernouf was the former HMS Lily. Prior to the explosion, Général Ernouf had 20-30 men killed and wounded; Renard had only nine wounded.

Earlier, Renard captured Eugene, which had been sailing from Bordeaux to New Orleans, and sent her into Jamaica.

On 11 October, Renard, after a long chase and some firing, captured the French privateer schooner Bellona (or Bellone) on the north side of San Domingo. Bellona was armed with four guns and had a crew of 50 men. She was seven days out of Barracona and had taken an American brig. Coghlan reported that Bellona was only four months old and was considered the fastest sailer out of Cuba. It is possible that this Bellona was the vessel that captured the American schooner Hiram, of New York, Fusson, master, that Success recaptured.

A French privateer captured, on 21 February 1806, the sloop James and the schooner Betsey, both of which were sailing from Calabash Bay to Kingston. The privateer also captured Hard Times, Banee, master, which was sailing from Black River to Kingston. Renard recaptured all three.

On 28 May 1806 Renard captured the French Navy brig Diligent (or Diligente), after a 64-hour-long chase. French records report that the capture took place in the Puerto Rico channel. She had sailed from Concarneau to Cayenne, and was cruising in the Antilles prior to her capture by the English sloop "Fox". Diligent, under the command of lieutenant de vaisseau Vincent Thévenard, was armed with fourteen 6-pounders and two 32-pounder brass carronades, and carried a crew of 125 men. She was seven days out of Pointe a Petre, Guadeloupe, with dispatches for France that she succeeded in throwing overboard while Renard was chasing her. She was coppered and copper fastened, and Coghlan believed only three years old. Diligente arrived at Jamaica on 3 June. Vice-Admiral Dacres had her purchased and commissioned as Diligent.

Thévenard had surrendered his ship without a shot being fired by either side. When taken on board Renard, her smallness surprised him and he requested to return to his ship to continue the fight. Coghlan naturally laughed at this request. Thévenard then asked that Coghlan award him a certificate stating that he had not acted in a cowardly manner. Coghlan replied "No, I cannot do that; but I will give you one that shall specify you have acted 'prudently'!"

In July or August 1807 Coghlan transferred to Elk. It is not clear who replaced him as commander of Renard.

On 1 October 1807 Renard captured the Danish vessel Peder and Anna. Within five days the sloop-of-war Renard had arrived at Deal, together with three other vessels, all four coming from Honduras.

== Fate ==
In December 1808 the Commissioners of the Navy offered "His Majesty's sloops ...Renard..." for sale at Sheerness. The Commissioners continued advertising her availability into May 1809, suggesting that she sold soon after that.
