= Pegine Echevarria =

- Occupations: Entrepreneur, author and motivational speaker.
- Known for: Team Pegine, Inc.
- Notable work: White Men Are Diverse Too!, For All Our Daughters: How Mentoring Helps Young Women and Girls Master the Art of Growing Up
- Spouse: Dr. David Herbin

Pegine Echevarria (pronounced: Peh-geen Etch-uh-vuh-ria) is an American entrepreneur, author, motivational speaker, life coach, and CEO of the Jacksonville-based Team Pegine, Inc.

== Early life ==
Echevarria spent her childhood in a poor neighborhood facing social issues such as violence and a struggling family. She was a gang member and was kicked out of high school. With the help of her aunt, grandmother and Girl Scout leader, she was able to start a career at the New York City public school and later worked in menswear manufacturing.

Her book, For All Our Daughters: How Mentoring Helps Young Women and Girls Master the Art of Growing Up, is based on the difficulties she faced over the course of her early life and career and interviews with about a thousand mentors, young girls and parents.

== Early career ==
Echevarria completed her master's degree in social work from Adelphi University after which she founded New York City Parent Educators Network. In her efforts towards educating parents in the subject, she contributed as an author to The Parents and Teachers' Guide to Helping Young Children Learn Creative Ideas from 35 Respected Experts, (Preschool Publications, 1997). She has also contributed as an expert in the field to books such as Guiding Young Children's Behavior: Helpful Ideas for Parents & Teachers from 28 Early Childhood Experts, The Parents' and Teachers' Guide to Helping Young Children Learn: Creative Ideas from 35 Respected Experts, and My Self My Family My Friends: 26 Experts Explore Young Children's Self-Esteem.

== Career ==
In 2012, Echevarria was the spokesperson for Clorox and presented at the Clorox/Hispanic Scholarship Fund at Miami Dade College as a part of the launch of the event Dream Without Limits.

Her company, Team Pegine, ranks among the 50 fastest growing companies in North Florida. In May 2012, her company was awarded an 8(a) contract by the Department of Defense in order to produce the 50th commemoration of the Vietnam War at the National Mall, an event presided by Barack Obama. Echevarria also created a foundation, Success4Vets, to help the veterans acquire leadership skills and settle in their civilian life. The project organizes the veteran community, provides opportunities as well as finances.

Echevarria is an active proponent of diversity and as a human resource management professional. She is a Certified Speaking Professional member of the National Speakers Association and is the only Latina inducted into the 58 member Motivational Speakers Hall of Fame and the only Latina in the Million Dollar Speakers Group. She was also named the "2010 Women in Business Champion of the Year for the North Florida District and the State of Florida." She has been featured in Minority Business Entrepreneur Magazine and is on the cover as a "Woman Who Rocks In Business." She was interviewed by columnist Devin Thrope (who covers social entrepreneurship and impact investing) in the Forbes article "Renowned Speaker Offers Tips To Women Entrepreneurs". Thorpe also interviewed Pegine for his online show.

Pegine was named to the Society of Human Resource Management 100 Global Thought Leaders in Diversity and Inclusion. She was a member of SHRM's former Diversity Special Expertise Panel.

== Awards and recognition ==
- Pearl of The Beaches for her work on women's issues
- Motivational Speakers Hall of Fame
- Certified Speaking Professional, National Speakers Association to Awards.

== Books ==
- For All Our Daughters How Mentoring Helps Young Women and Girls Master the Art of Growing Up (1996) ISBN 1-886284-13-X
- Sometimes You Need to Kick Your Own Butt (2002) ISBN 1-59975-694-3
- I’ve Got the Power to Lead and Think Big (2012) ISBN 978-0-9839791-2-8
- Tengo El Poder Pensar Grande (2012) ISBN 978-0-9839791-3-5
- Bragging Rights: Transform Your Team in 21 Days (2012) ISBN 978-0-9839791-1-1
