= Cathcart Challenge Cup =

- Class: Grade 2
- Location: Cheltenham Racecourse; Cheltenham, England
- Inaugurated: 1938
- Final run: 18 March 2004
- Race type: Chase
- Website: Cheltenham

Race information
- Distance: 2m 5f (4,225 metres)
- Surface: Turf
- Track: Left-handed
- Qualification: Five-years-old and up
- Weight: 10 st 9 lb (5yo); 11 st 0 lb (6yo+); Allowances; 7 lb for mares Penalties for wins 9 lb for Class A wfa chase * 6 lb for Class B wfa chase * 5 lb for Class A or B chase ** 3 lb for Class C chase * in current season ** in previous season
- Purse: £80,000 (2004); 1st: £46,400

The Cathcart Challenge Cup was a Grade 2 National Hunt chase in Great Britain which was open to horses aged five years or older. It was run on the New Course at Cheltenham over a distance of about 2 miles and 5 furlongs (4,225 metres), and during its running there were seventeen fences to be jumped. The race was for first and second-season chasers, and it was scheduled to take place each year during the Cheltenham Festival in March.

The event was established in 1938, and it was named in honour of Frederick Cathcart, the clerk of the course and chairman at Cheltenham from 1908 to 1934. During its history the race had various formats, including a brief period as a hunter chase in the late 1970s.

The Cathcart Challenge Cup was last run in 2004, and it was replaced the following year by what is now known as the Ryanair Chase. Unlike the last version of the "Cathcart", the latter race is open to horses beyond their second year of chasing.

== Records ==
Most successful horse since 1946 (2 wins):

- Quita Que – 1958, 1961
- Half Free – 1986, 1987
- Stormyfairweather – 1999, 2000

Leading jockey since 1946 (4 wins):

- Bryan Marshall – Leap Man (1946), Jack Tatters (1948), Semeur (1951), Coolrock (1952)

Leading trainer since 1946 (7 wins):

- Fred Winter – Soloning (1972), Soothsayer (1974), Roller Coaster (1979), Dramatist (1982), Observe (1983), Half Free (1986, 1987)

== Winners ==
- Amateur jockeys indicated by "Mr".

Year	Winner	Age	Jockey	Trainer
1938	Asterabad	7	Thomas F Carey	George Beeby
1939	Alexandrina	10	Danny Morgan	Ivor Anthony
1940	Straight Larch	10	Ben Lay	Ronnie Bennett
1941	Knight O' London	9	Fred Rimell	Tom Rimell
1942	Roi D'Egypte	7	Bryan Marshall	H Whiteman
	no race 1943-1945
1946	Leap Man	9	Bryan Marshall	Fulke Walwyn
	no race 1947 ^{[1]}
1948	Jack Tatters	10	Bryan Marshall	Fulke Walwyn
	no race 1949 ^{[2]}
1950	River Trout	7	Martin Molony	Ginger Dennistoun
1951	Semeur	5	Bryan Marshall	Fulke Walwyn
1952	Coolrock	7	Bryan Marshall	Fulke Walwyn
1953	Arctic Gold	8	Glen Kelly	Gerald Balding
1954	Royal Approach	6	Pat Taaffe	Tom Dreaper
	no race 1955 ^{[2]}
1956	Amber Wave	8	Michael Scudamore	Geoffrey Champneys
1957	Rose's Quarter	10	Dave Dick	George Beeby
1958	Quita Que	9	Bunny Cox	Dan Moore
1959	Gallery Goddess	8	Fred Winter	Charlie Mallon
1960	Dove Cote	10	Mick Batchelor	Stewart Wight
1961	Quita Que	12	Willie Robinson	Dan Moore
1962	Hoodwinked	7	David Nicholson	Neville Crump
1963	Some Alibi	8	Willie Robinson	Fulke Walwyn
1964	Panisse	9	Michael Scudamore	Willie Stephenson
1965	Scottish Memories	11	Bobby Beasley	Paddy Sleator
1966	Flying Wild	10	Tommy Carberry	Dan Moore
1967	Prince Blarney	7	Ron Barry	John Barclay
1968	Muir	9	Pat Taaffe	Tom Dreaper
1969	Kinloch Brae	6	Timmy Hyde	Willie O'Grady
1970	Garrynagree	7	Pat Taaffe	Tom Dreaper
1971	The Laird	10	Jeff King	Bob Turnell
1972	Soloning	7	Richard Pitman	Fred Winter
1973	Inkslinger	6	Tommy Carberry	Dan Moore
1974	Soothsayer	7	Richard Pitman	Fred Winter
	no race 1975 ^{[3]}
1976	Mickley Seabright	8	Mr Peter Brookshaw	Fred Rimell
1977	Rusty Tears	6	Mr Niall Madden	Edward O'Grady
	no race 1978 ^{[3]}
1979	Roller Coaster	6	John Francome	Fred Winter
1980	King Weasel	8	Jonjo O'Neill	Peter Easterby
1981	Lord Greystoke	10	Neale Doughty	Gordon W. Richards
1982	Dramatist	11	Bill Smith	Fulke Walwyn
1983	Observe	7	John Francome	Fred Winter
1984	The Mighty Mac	9	Mr Dermot Browne	Michael Dickinson
1985	Straight Accord	10	Stuart Shilston	Fulke Walwyn
1986	Half Free	10	Simon Sherwood	Fred Winter
1987	Half Free	11	Peter Scudamore	Fred Winter
1988	Private Views	7	Brendan Powell	Nick Gaselee
1989	Observer Corps	8	Tom Morgan	John Edwards
1990	Brown Windsor	8	John White	Nicky Henderson
1991	Chatam	7	Peter Scudamore	Martin Pipe
1992	Repeat the Dose	7	Mark Richards	Tim Etherington
1993	Second Schedual	8	Adrian Maguire	Arthur Moore
1994	Raymylette	7	Mick Fitzgerald	Nicky Henderson
1995	Coulton	8	Jamie Osborne	Oliver Sherwood
1996	Challenger du Luc	6	David Bridgwater	Martin Pipe
1997	Sparky Gayle	7	Brian Storey	Colin Parker
1998	Cyfor Malta	5	Tony McCoy	Martin Pipe
1999	Stormyfairweather	7	Mick Fitzgerald	Nicky Henderson
2000	Stormyfairweather	8	Mick Fitzgerald	Nicky Henderson
	no race 2001 ^{[4]}
2002	Royal Auclair	5	Tony McCoy	Martin Pipe
2003	La Landiere	8	Richard Johnson	Richard Phillips
2004	Our Armageddon	7	Larry McGrath	Richard Guest

^{1} The 1947 edition was abandoned because of snow and frost.
^{2} It was cancelled in 1949 due to frost, and in 1955 due to snow.
^{3} The race was abandoned in 1975 due to waterlogging, and in 1978 because of snow.
^{4} The 2001 running was cancelled because of a foot-and-mouth crisis.

== See also ==
- Horseracing in Great Britain
- List of British National Hunt races
