= Robert Heir =

Actor in Australia (1832–1868)

Robert James Heir (10 February 1832 – 27 February 1868) was an actor in Australia, best known as the first husband of the great actress Fanny Cathcart.

== History ==
Heir arrived in Melbourne by the George Marshall, and made his first appearance on 11 April 1855 at the Queen's Theatre, Melbourne as "Icilius" in Knowles' drama Virginius with G. V. Brooke and Fanny Cathcart.

Heir and Cathcart were playing Morris Barnett's comedy, The Serious Family, for George Coppin at his newly-opened Olympic Theatre, with G. V. Brooke and R. Younge, when they married and after the last performance defected to the rival company of John Black at the Theatre Royal to play Thomas Morton's comedy A Roland for an Oliver, which they had performed for Coppin a few months earlier.

=== Death ===
Mr and Mrs Heir were booked to appear at the Invercargill Theatre, New Zealand, in 1868, but he died on the passage across, and was buried at The Bluff, one of the most southerly towns in that country. A later pilgrim to the cemetery was surprised at the condition of his grave, unmarked and unkempt. It was in a similar condition thirty years later, when the Mayor of Invercargill wrote to Nellie Stewart, who brought the matter to the attention of the Australasian Dramatic and Musical Association, and a headstone was procured.

=== Personal ===
Heir married Mary Fanny Cathcart (3 August 1833 – 3 January 1880) around early 1855. A daughter was born on 23 March 1856, the first of five children, who all died young. She married George Darrell (1851–1921) on 20 January 1870.
