= Hogshead (disambiguation) =

A hogshead is a large cask of liquid, and also a measure of volume.

Hogshead may also refer to:

- Hogshead Publishing, a former British game company
- Sally Hogshead (active from 1991), American author

== See also ==
- Hogshead cheese
- Nancy Hogshead-Makar (born 1962), American swimmer
