= Mark Sanborn =

Explores the life of Mark Sanborn

- Education: Ohio State University
- Occupations: Author, motivational speaker, entrepreneur.
- Years active: 1986 – present
- Website: marksanborn.com

Mark Sanborn is an American author, professional speaker, and entrepreneur. He is best known for his book The Fred Factor: How Passion In Your Work and Life Can Turn the Ordinary into the Extraordinary. The book, inspired by postman Fred Shea, sold over 2 million copies worldwide and became a New York Times, Wall Street Journal, USA Today bestseller.

== Early life ==
Sanborn graduated with cum laude from Ohio State University. After graduating, he worked as an account executive, regional manager and associate publisher. In 1978-79 he served as president for the National FFA Organization, and later served as president for the National Speakers Association.

== Career ==
Sanborn holds a certified speaking professional designation from the National Speakers Association (NSA) and is a member of the Speaker Hall of Fame (CPAE), and Speakers Roundtable. He is also a recipient of the Cavett Award in recognition of his contributions to the speaking profession, and the Ambassador of Free Enterprise Award by Sales & Marketing Executives International.

Sanborn has written and co-authored eight books. He has also authored various videos and audio training programs on leadership, change, teamwork and customer service. His video series “Team Building: How to Motivate and Manage People” made it to the #2 spot for bestselling educational video series in the U.S.

He is also the president of Sanborn & Associates, Inc., a leadership development company. He is an adjunct professor at the University of Memphis.

Sanborn is the Leadership Expert in Residence at High Point University.

== Bibliography ==
- Teambuilt: Making Teamwork Work, Master Media Pub Corp, 1994. ISBN 978-0942361940
- The Fred Factor: Every Person's Guide to Making the Ordinary Extraordinary!, Executive Books, 2002. ISBN 978-0937539620
- You Don't Need a Title to Be a Leader: How Anyone, Anywhere, Can Make a Positive Difference, Crown Business, 2006. ASIN: B000JMKR9S
- Developing Leaders in Business and Life, Made for Success, 2008. ASIN: B001BZIWY4
- The Encore Effect: How to Achieve Remarkable Performance in Anything You Do, Crown Business, 2008. ASIN: B001EW52FG
- Encore Effect, Random House Business, 2009. ISBN 978-1847940353
- Up, Down, or Sideways: How to Succeed When Times Are Good, Bad, or In Between, Oasis Audio, 2011. ASIN: B005RTV936
- Fred 2.0: New Ideas on How to Keep Delivering Extraordinary Results, Tyndale House Publishers, 2013. ISBN 978-1414362205

== Awards ==
- NidoQubein Philanthropy Award, NSA Foundation
- Cavett Award, National Speakers Association Free Enterprise Award
- Inducted into the Speaker Hall of Fame
- SMEI Ambassador of Free Enterprise award
