= James Cathcart =

James Cathcart may refer to:

- James Carter Cathcart (1954–2025), American voice actor
- J. F. Cathcart (James Faucett Cathcart, 1827–1902), English actor in Australia
- James Leander Cathcart (1767–1843), diplomat, slave, and sailor
