= Ellen Mortyn =

English actress

Ellen Mortyn (c. 1834 – 22 June 1859) was an English actress who died of consumption in Australia under controversial circumstances.

== History ==
Nothing has been found as to her early life. She was described as a leading lady of the Theatre Royal, Dublin. She was married to Charles George Mortyn of London and had two children, but had left him around 1855 on account of his drunken behavior.

She came to Australia in 1858 with George Coppin to play with G. V. Brooke's company at Melbourne's Theatre Royal. In August she starred with Fred Younge in Tom Taylor's Pygmalion-esque An Unequal Match as "Hester Gazebrook", the role in which Lillie Langtry made her American debut in 1882. She next played "Miriam" in (Mr) Shirley Brooks' Daughter of the Stars, a two-act play touted as a comedy, but was criticised as an extended homily which "would only amuse Society of Friends adherents and undertakers". Next was Taylor's Helping Hands, which also starred the two Younge brothers - Fred and Richard.

She also played in Bayle Bernard's A Life's Trial, Douglas Jerrold's St Cupid, She was a well-received Ophelia, in Hamlet, her first appearance in Shakespeare in Australia.

== Death ==
Her last role was as "Sylvia" in The Two Gentlemen of Verona at the Theatre Royal, Melbourne from 6 June 1859, but had to retire a week later due to haemorrhage of the lungs, attended to by Dr L. L. Smith and nursed by Mrs Smith and Brooke's wife. Her condition worsened rapidly and she died two weeks later, suffering pulmonary phthisis, caused by tuberculosis, hastened by hemoptysis (coughing up blood) and had been originally reported as having broken a blood vessel.

Popular rumour had her procuring an abortion from Dr Smith and dying from complications. At the inquest a surgeon, Dr Iffla, testified that she was pregnant and he had refused to perform such a procedure as it was illegal, and that he didn't want legal problems like those of Dr L. L. Smith. She subsequently consulted Smith. The subject was not pursued further as four medical men testified that she had died from complications arising from diseased lungs.

Her remains were buried at the New Melbourne Cemetery, attended by members of both Houses of Parliament and City Council, Press, and several thousand onlookers. Pallbearers included Dr L. L. Smith, George Coppin, G. V. Brooke and Robert Heir. Fund-raising benefits for Mortyn's daughter were conducted by the two companies with which she had been associated — those of the Theatre Royal and the Olympic, but such was the ill-feeling between the two that G. V. Brooke of the "Royal" would not countenance Younge's suggestion of combining the two sums.
