= Monica Wofford =

American business executive

Monica L. Wofford
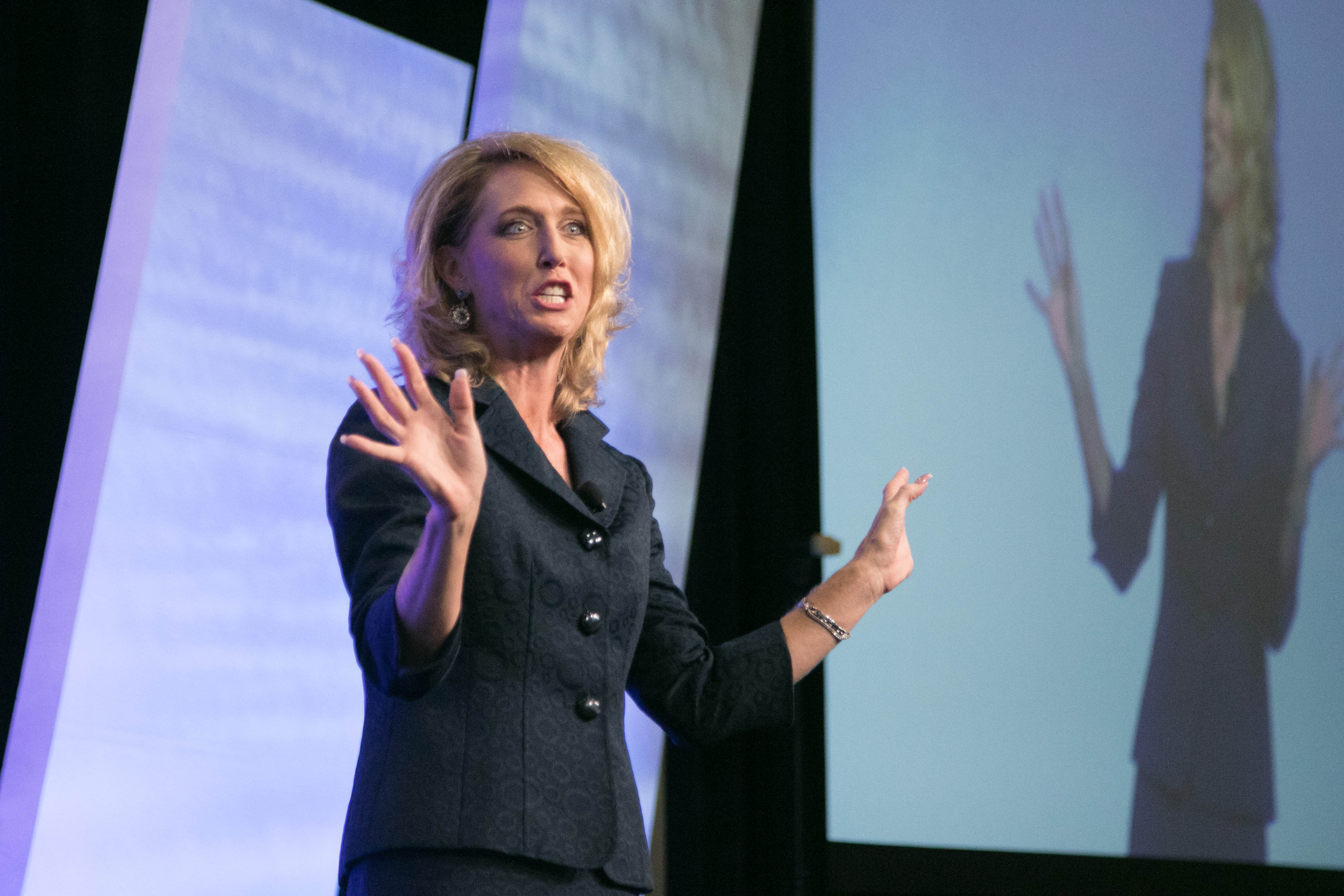
- Wofford as the keynote speaker for the Florida Tax Collectors Association
- Occupations: CEO, consultant, speaker, author
- Website: Contagious Companies

Monica L. Wofford, CSP, is an American business executive and founder of Contagious Companies.

Before founding the training and consulting firm, Contagious Companies, in 2003, Wofford began her speaking and training career in 1989 with her first keynote to 9000 fellow students. She has worked with leadership teams in companies such as the US Mint, the Transportation and Safety Administration, the FAA, SHRM, Hallmark, Combined Insurance, AT&T, Estee Lauder, the Non-Profit Times, Cabela's, Microsoft, and SeaWorld. She has spoken or trained in all 50 states and 27 countries for events and organizations including TED Talks, the Association of Corporate Contributions Professionals, and the Association of Legal Administrators.

Wofford has been interviewed or quoted by media outlets such as Fortune, Forbes, CNBC, the Toronto Sun, Entrepreneur, CNN Headline News, Bloomberg Businessweek, and U.S. News.

She is the author of eight books, including Make Difficult People Disappear: How to Deal with Stressful Behavior and Eliminate Conflict, Contagious Leadership, and Let’s Talk Leadership. She is a former board member and national treasurer of the National Speakers Association.

On 1 September 2017, Wofford filed to run for the Florida House of Representatives in District 32, which includes most of Lake County. She qualified for the ballot by petition in March 2018.

From 2020 to 2022, she served as the CEO of United Way of Lake & Sumter Counties. As of 2026, she serves on the Executive Board of the South Lake Chamber of Commerce.
