= Ethel Grow =

American contralto (1875–1954)

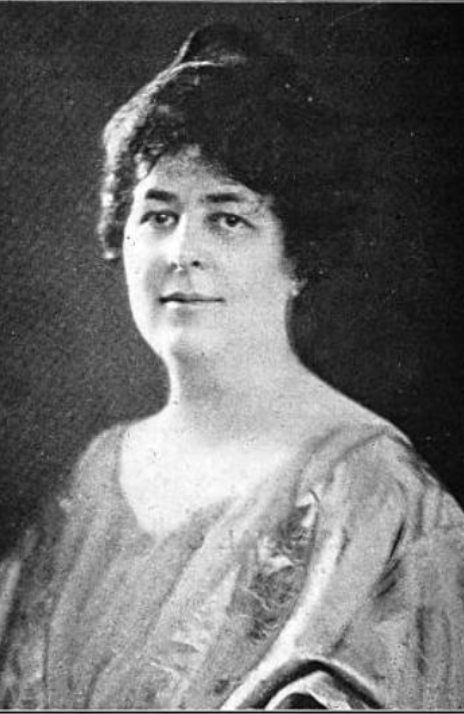
- Ethel Grow, from a 1922 publication
- Born: April 11, 1875; Maywood, Illinois, U.S.
- Died: April 1954 (age 78-79); Princeton Township, Mercer County, New Jersey, U.S.
- Occupation: Contralto singer
- Partner: Jane R. Cathcart

Ethel Carrie Grow (April 11, 1875 – April 1954) was an American contralto singer from Chicago, heard in oratorio, recital, concert, and radio settings, especially in the 1920s.

== Early life and education ==
Grow was born in Maywood near Chicago, the daughter of Charles Arthur Grow and Carrie Dwight Ingersoll Grow. Her father died when she was a baby. She trained as a singer in Chicago with George Monroe, and in England.

== Career ==
Grow gave a concert with pianist Carolyn Louise Willard in Chicago in 1905. By 1907, Grow was considered "one of the most prominent church singers of Chicago." She gave radio recitals in the 1920s, including one in 1923 singing compositions by Gena Branscombe. She sang at the Plaza Hotel in 1923, and at Carnegie Hall in 1926, both times presented by the Washington Heights Musical Club. In 1927 she directed a chorus at Town Hall, for a radio broadcast.

Grow sang at Aeolian Hall several times: In 1921, with fellow contralto Helena Marsh; in 1922, in a program of songs by American composers; in a "novel program" in 1924; and in 1925, when a fire nearby delayed the start of the performance. Her "exceedingly interesting, far from the beaten track" program at the Aeolian Hall in 1924, also given at the Century Club of Scranton in 1926, was "vocal chamber music" the New York String Quartet. "Miss Grow is the only artist today who is doing an entire program of vocal chamber music; the program is not voice with string accompaniment, but ensemble. It took Miss Grow one year to arrange this program and find her material," reported the Scranton Tribune, admiring her "fearlessless in trying the new things".

Grow took a cottage at Lake George to prepare programs in summer 1922. She sang at, and judged, a glee club competition in Vermont in 1923. In 1926, Grow taught voice students during her stay in Pittsburgh.

== Personal life ==
Grow lived and worked with clubwoman and pianist Jane R. Cathcart for almost thirty years. Cathcart died in 1947. and Grow died in 1954, in the month of her 79th birthday, in New Jersey.
