= HMS Diligent (1806) =

Brig of the French navy, later sloop of the Royal Navy

History

France
- Name: Diligent
- Builder: Jean Fouache and Enterprise Thibaudier, Le Havre
- Laid down: August 1800
- Launched: 25 June 1800
- Captured: May 1806

United Kingdom
- Name: HMS Diligent
- Acquired: By capture May 1806
- Renamed: HMS Prudente (October 1806); HMS Wolf (September 1807)
- Fate: Sold in 1811

General characteristics
- Type: Brig
- Displacement: between 349 & 373 tons
- Tons burthen: 31785/94 (bm)
- Length: 93 ft 6 in (28.5 m) (overall); 75 ft 4 in (23.0 m) (keel)
- Beam: 28 ft 2 in (8.6 m)
- Depth of hold: 7 ft 3 in (2.2 m)
- Complement: French service:105; British service:95
- Armament: French service: 14 × 6-pounder guns; 2 × 32-pounder brass carronades; British service: 14 × 24-pounder carronades; 2 × 6-pounder bow chasers

HMS Diligent was the French naval brig Diligent, launched in 1800, that HMS Renard captured in 1806. The Royal Navy took her into service under her existing name, which it later changed, first to Prudente, and then to Wolf. During her two years of active duty with the Royal Navy she captured two small privateers. Wolf was laid up in 1808 and sold in 1811.

== French service and capture ==
Diligent was the sixth of the six-vessel class of Vigilant-class brigs, and initially (October 1799), was designated No. 6. Although Diligent was launched in 1800, completion took until September 1801.

=== Capture: French account ===
Diligent was under the command of lieutenant de vaisseau Vincent Thevenard and part of a small squadron under Commodore Jean-Marthe-Adrien l'Hermite, in Régulus, that departed from Lorient on 22 October 1805. Diligent ran into difficulties and had to return to port that same day. The squadron went on to engage in commerce raiding off the coast of Africa and then the Caribbean.

Diligent set out again a few days later with Thevenard searching for l'Hermite and his squadron at cayenne and the Antilles, but without success. After stopping at Guadeloupe to make several essential repairs, Thevenard decided to cruise the Leeward Isles. In the morning of 25 May 1806 Diligent sighted two strange vessels in the channel northwest of Puerto Rico. They followed Diligent, but by 27 May there was only one, which Thevenard thought might be the British frigate Magicienne, which was known to be in the area. Thevenard wanted to maneuver to deliver a broadside but at a council of war with his officers that day, they advised staying away. Next morning, the crew of Diligent were exhausted from having been at the sweeps for 30 hours; Diligent, being closer to the coast had suffered from inconsistent wind conditions, while the British vessel, being further from shore, had benefited from more stable conditions. With a crew unwilling to man the guns, Thevenard eventually struck to Renard, a brig, without a shot being fired.

The court martial board unanimously acquitted Thevenard for the loss of his vessel. However, it found that he had not done everything necessary to prevent his crew from becoming discouraged and unwilling to fight. It particularly reprimanded him for having mistaken a brig for a frigate for too long.

=== Capture: British account ===
On 28 May Renard, under Commander Jeremiah Coghlan, captured Diligent after a 64-hour-long chase. She was seven days out of Pointe a Petre, Guadeloupe, with dispatches for France, which she succeeded in throwing overboard while Renard was chasing her. French records report that the capture took place in the Puerto Rico channel. She had sailed from Concarneau to Cayenne, and was cruising in the Antilles prior to her capture by the English sloop "Fox". Diligente arrived at Jamaica on 3 June.

Thévenard had surrendered his ship without a shot being fired by either side. When taken on board Renard, her smallness surprised him and he requested that he might be returned to his ship to continue the fight. Coghlan laughed at this request. Thévenard then seriously asked Coghlan for a certificate stating that he had not acted in a cowardly manner. Coghlan replied "No, I cannot do that; but I will give you one that shall specify you have acted 'prudently'!"

In his discussion of the action, the author William James, in his naval history, made much of what he termed Thevenard's cowardice. He further opined that as Thevenard had continued in the French navy until 1817, he must have misrepresented what had occurred. James did not draw attention to Renard having a broadside twice the weight of Diligent's broadside and argued that Thevenard should have attempted to capture Renard by boarding.

== British career ==
Vice-Admiral Dacres had Diligent purchased and commissioned in May as HMS Diligent (or Diligente), under Commander William Sumner Hall.

On 2 October 1806, Diligente was seven leagues south of Cape Engana when she saw a sail. After a chase of some 20 hours, the winds were so calm that Hall sent his boats after the strange vessel. After another two hours the boats captured the French schooner Napoleon. Napoleon was armed with one long 9-pounder gun and had on board 14 crew and passengers. She was on the way from Samana to Santo Domingo to secure a letter of marque and a larger crew.

In October Diligent was renamed Prudente. It apparently took some time for news of the name change to diffuse fully. Lloyd's List reported that the brig Diligente detained the American schooner Polly, which was sailing from Havana to New Orleans, and sent her into Jamaica.

In September 1807 Prudent was renamed HMS Wolf. In March 1808 Lieutenant Edmund Waller replaced Hall.

On 1 May 1808, Wolf was escorting a convoy sailing from Jamaica to London when the convoy commander, Captain Sir Charles Brisbane, in HMS Arethusa, sent Waller to round up the slowest vessels. As Waller was doing so, he sighted a strange sail to the south-east, and immediately gave chase. After a chase of two hours, Wolf was able to capture the Spanish privateer schooner Braganza, Joseph Caudanio, captain, of one gun and 54 men. (Note: Subsequent prize money notices gave the privateer's name as Venganza.) She was 22 days out of Carthagena and had captured the Anne, one of the vessels in the convoy. After another chase, this of four hours, Wolf succeeded in recapturing the Anne. Wolf sent the recaptured Ann, Braugh, master, into the fleet.

== Fate ==
Lieutenant Waller's promotion to Commander was confirmed on 20 July 1808. Wolf arrived at Plymouth on 21 July. She was paid off there and laid up. She was sold in June 1811.
