= Willie Jolley =

American author and speaker

- Born: September 3, 1956 (age 69); Washington, D.C.
- Education: American University; California Graduate School of Theology
- Occupations: Motivational speaker, entrepreneur and author
- Website: williejolley.com

Willie Jolley (born September 3, 1956, Washington, D.C.) is an author, radio host, speaker, singer and media personality. He is best known for his motivational best selling book, It Only Takes A Minute To Change Your Life. In 1999, he was named as one of the outstanding five speakers in the World by Toastmasters International and was also inducted into the 2012 Speaker Hall of Fame by the National Speakers Association.

== Early life and education ==
Jolley was born in Washington, D.C. He received his Bachelor's in Art degree with specialization in psychology and sociology from The American University in 1978 and a master's degree in theology from Wesley Theological seminary. He completed his Doctorate of Ministry Degree in Faith Driven Achievement from the California Graduate School of Theology.

== Career ==
Jolley began his career as a solo vocalist, singing jingles for companies such as Pizza Hut, Oldsmobile, and Black Entertainment Television. His voice was featured in national TV and radio jingles. He was later fired from the job and went on to become a motivational speaker. Jolley has given motivational talks to multinational corporate houses for corporate training, leadership, motivation, team-building, and personal breakthroughs.

He also hosts a regular show, Willie Jolley Show on SiriusXM.

== Bibliography ==
- Jolley, Willie (March 15, 1997). It Only Takes A Minute To Change Your Life. Macmillan. ISBN 9780312961107.
- Jolley, Willie (September 9, 2000). A Setback Is a Setup for a Comeback: Turn Your Moments of Doubt and Fear Into Times of Triumph. Macmillan. ISBN 9780312267735.
- Jolley, Willie (January 21, 2010). Turn Setbacks into Greenbacks: 7 Secrets for Going Up in Down Times. Wiley. ISBN 9780470594339.
- Jolley, Willie (January 19, 2016). Turn Setbacks Into Greenbacks: 7 Steps To Go From Financial Disaster to Financial Freedom. Sound Wisdom. ISBN 9780768408898.
- Jolley, Willie (2000). A Setback Is a Setup for a Comeback: Turn Your Moments of Doubt and Fear Into Times of Triumph. GOKO Management Group. ISBN 9780957808102.
- Jolley, Dr Willie (October 16, 2018). An Attitude of Excellence: Get The Best From Yourself, Your Team, and Your Organization. BenBella Books. ISBN 9781946885593.
- Jolley, Willie; Taylor-Jolley, Dee (April 11, 2017). Make Love, Make Money, Make It Last!: 10 Secrets to Shape a Great Marriage. Willie Jolley Worldwide. ISBN 9780999273104.

== Awards ==
- 1986- Best Male Jazz Vocalist WAMMIE (Washington Area Music Association)
- 1990– Best Male Jazz Vocalist WAMMIE
- 1991– Best Male Inspirational Vocalist WAMMIE award
- 1992– Best Male Inspirational Vocalist WAMMIE award
- 1999– One of the Outstanding Five Speakers in the World by Toastmasters International
- 2012– Recipient of the Ron Brown Distinguished Leadership Award
- 2012– Council of Peers Award of Excellence, Speaker Hall of Fame, National Speakers Association
- 2013– "One of the Top 5 Leadership Speakers" by Speaking.com
- 2013– Business Leader of The Year by The African American Chambers of Commerce
- 2015 – National Champion of Business Award by Concerned Black Men National
- 2017 – Legends of Speaking Lifetime Achievement Award by Veterans Speakers Retreat

== Appointments ==
- Member of the National Speakers Association since 1991
- President of the National Capital Speakers Association, 1995–96
