= William Cathcart (Royal Navy officer) =

British naval officer (1782–1804)

Captain The Honourable William Cathcart
- Born: 30 June 1782; London, England
- Died: 4 June 1804 (aged 21); Jamaica, West Indies
- Relatives: William Cathcart, 10th Lord Cathcart (father); Sir George Cathcart (brother)
- Military career
- Allegiance: United Kingdom
- Branch: Royal Navy
- Service years: 1795–1804
- Rank: Captain
- Commands: HMS Renard; HMS Medusa; HMS Clorinde
- Conflicts: French Revolutionary Wars; Napoleonic Wars

William Cathcart, Master of Cathcart (30 June 1782 – 4 June 1804) was an officer in the Royal Navy during the French Revolutionary and Napoleonic Wars.

== Early life ==
He was the eldest son of Scottish peer William Cathcart, 10th Lord Cathcart, later Earl Cathcart, and of Elizabeth Elliott, the daughter of Andrew Elliot, the governor of New York. His younger brother was General, the Honourable Sir George Cathcart KCB DL. Cathcart was educated in the paternal tradition at Eton College, Windsor, Berkshire, United Kingdom.

== Naval career ==
Cathcart joined the Royal Navy in August 1795 as a volunteer aboard Melpomene, a thirty-eight gun, fifth rate vessel originally captured from the French in 1794, being finally decommissioned in 1815. Subsequently, he served on Pallas as a supernumerary (6 May – 6 August 1796), Able Seaman on Romulus (21 August 1796 – 13 January 1797), Midshipman (14 January – 12 November 1797), Midshipman and Master's Mate on Alcmene (13 November 1797 – 7 March 1799), and Midshipman on Majestic (8 March – 2 December 1799). He was made lieutenant on 2 September 1801.

He served on Medusa and was made master and commander on 14 April 1802. This ship was highly active in various theatres of operations and had a prolific service life, the log of which is preserved and is accessible online through the University of Glasgow. However, Cathcart's presence on board is, at present, only considered presumptive. He then in October 1802 took charge of the sloop Renard, another addition from the French Navy. Having subsequently being appointed post captain, Cathcart took command of the frigate Clorinde, captured in 1803 at Santo Domingo. He died in the West Indies of yellow fever while commanding her, on 4 June 1804 at the age of 21. He is reported to have served with distinction at the raids on Boulogne, a naval action of August, 1801 in which the Royal Navy attempted to destroy components of the French fleet in that port.

== Cathcart's role in the Raids on Boulogne ==
During the second raid on Boulogne, Cathcart is reported to have served with great distinction as part of a boat crew tasked with the destruction of a French naval target. At the time of this action, Cathcart is reported to have already served time in the Mediterranean and was presently serving with the inshore squadron off Brest as acting lieutenant on board the frigate, Medusa, to which Nelson had recently transferred his flag. For the attack on the enemy flotilla, Cathcart was placed in command of the ships' cutter. In recognition of Cathcart's conspicuous conduct during the attack, Captain Edward T. Parker sent the following despatch to Nelson on 16 August 1801, having been mortally wounded himself in the action and dying from his injuries a short time later,

It is at this moment that I feel myself at a loss for words to do justice to the officers and crew of the Medusa who were in the boat with me, and to Lieut. Langford, the officers and crew of the same ship, who nobly seconded us in the barge, until all her crew were killed or wounded; and to the Hon. Mr. Cathcart, who commanded the Medusa's cutter, and sustained the attack with the greatest intrepidity, until the desperate situation I was left in obliged me to call him to the assistance of the sufferers in my boat. The boats were no sooner alongside than we attempted to board; but a very strong netting, traced up to her lower yards, baffled all our endeavours, and an instantaneous discharge of her guns and small arms, from about 200 soldiers on her gunwale, knocked myself, Mr. Kirby, the Master of the Medusa, and Mr. Gore, a midshipman, with two thirds of the crew, upon our backs into the boat, all either killed or wounded desperately. The barge and cutter being on the outside, sheered off with the tide, but the flat boat, in which I was, hung alongside, and as there was not an officer or man left to govern her, must have fallen into the hands of the enemy, had not Mr. Cathcart taken her in tow, and carried her off.

Having been rescued by Cathcart, worthy of note is the obituary for Parker which indicates the sacrifice of the failed attack in which Cathcart had heroically acquitted himself.

The 26th instant at Deal, the gallant E. T. Parker, of the wounds he received in the second attack on the French flotilla off Boulogne. Every attention was paid to this meritorious Officer that his lamentable situation demanded. Earl St. Vincent, with that humanity which has ever marked his conduct, sent down his own surgeon to attend him; and great hopes were entertained for a time that not only his valuable life, but his limb would be saved; the flattering expectations of his friends were, however, disappointed; he suffered amputation very high in the thigh on the 16th instant, one of the arteries burst, and the great effusion of blood reduced him to so low a state, that he only languished till the morning of the 27th, when "His noble spirit sought the shades, to the great regret of every Briton, and particularly of his gallant Commander Lord Nelson. His memory will ever be dear to a grateful Nation in the defence of whose liberties he so bravely distinguished himself.

== Death ==
Cathcart was appointed as post-captain on HMS Clorinde, captured along with the Surveillante, after foundering on rocks while attempting escape from a joint British and Haitian siege of Santo Domingo, under the command of Emmanuel Halgan, in 1803. The ship was recovered and was then transferred to Jamaica during which time Cathcart assumed charge of the ship. However, before he could ascend fully to his new command, Cathcart contracted yellow fever, which proved fatal. The Cathcart genealogical entry for him states that,"This gallant young officer fell a victim to the yellow fever, at Jamaica, when in command of the Clorinde frigate, with the rank of post-captain, 5th June 1804, in his 22d year, unmarried."
