= Ron Karr =

American speaker and author

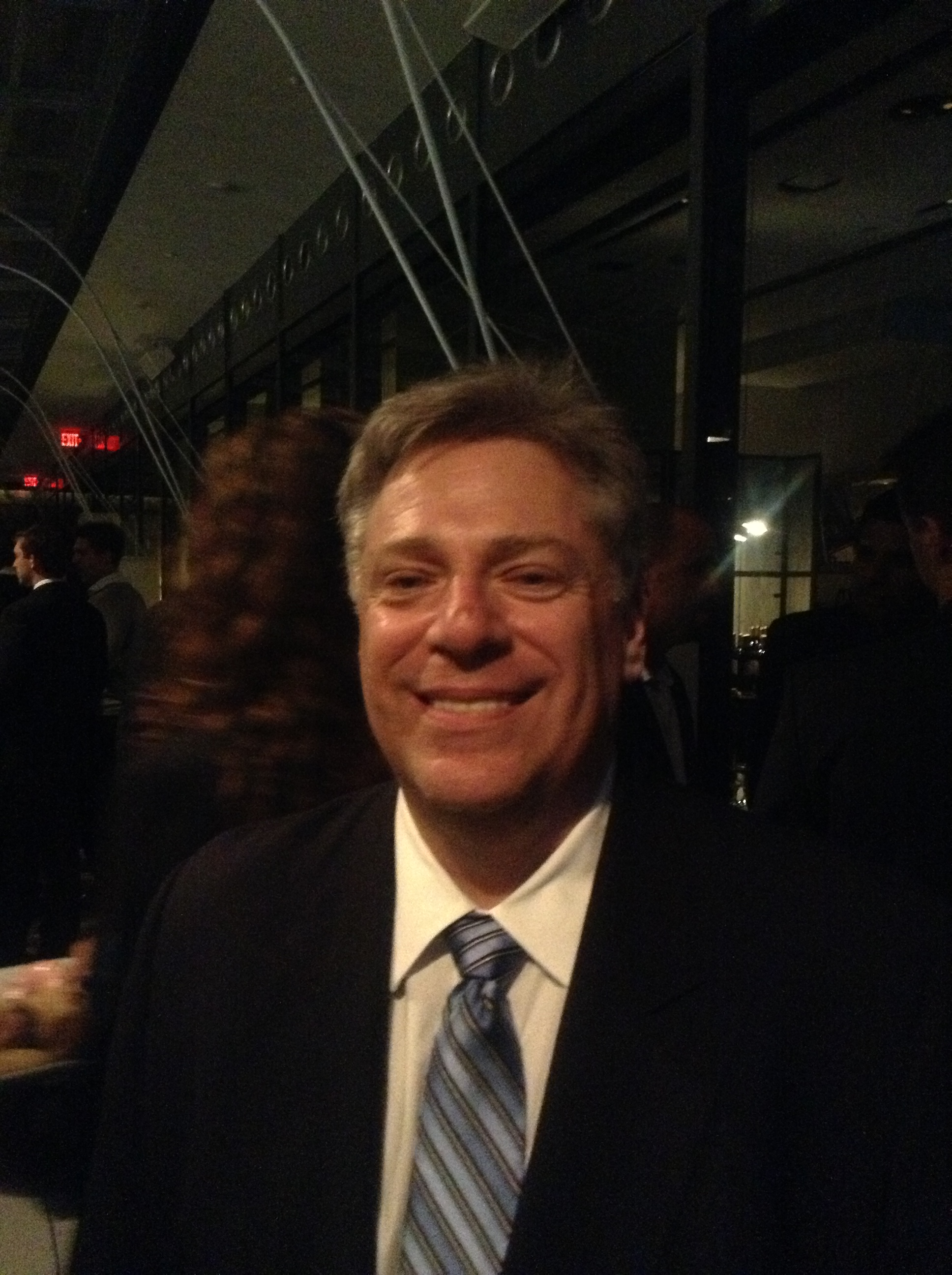
- Education: Skidmore College
- Occupations: Speaker, marketing consultant, author

Ron Karr is an American speaker, marketing consultant and author based in New Jersey. He was elected President of National Speakers Association for 2013–14 and he is the President of Karr Associates, Inc. Karr is a National Board Member of the NSA and a past president of the New York City Chapter of NSA. In 1995, the New York Tri-State Chapter presented him with the Golden Mike Award.

== Personal life and education ==
He is the son of Miriam Karr who was an economist and served as the Vice President of Counter Trade Group at Chase Manhattan Bank. He graduated from the Skidmore College in 1978.

== Career ==
Karr is a member of the National Speakers Association and is a past president of its New York City Chapter. In 2008, he appeared with Steve Forbes and was awarded the President's Award for Distinguished Service for the second time. Karr is also a National board member of the NSA. He has also served on the faculty of the American Management Association and the Urban Business Assistance Corporation. Karr is a National board member of the NSA and the president of NSA for 2013–14. Karr is the author of The Titan Principle: The Number One Secret to Sales Success, a book about influencing behaviour to generate sales. He has co-authored a book titled The Complete Idiot’s Guide to Great Customer Service with Don Blohowiak. He has also published articles in several magazines including Entrepreneur and Home Office Computing. In 2009, Karr wrote a book titled Lead, Sell, or Get Out of the Way, a book about the practices of best sales performers.

== Awards and honors ==
- Listed in Who's Who of Global Business Leaders
- 1997 – National Speakers Association President's Award for Distinguished Service
- 1995 – Awarded Golden Mike Award from New York Chapter of NSA
- 2008 – National Speakers Association President's Award for Distinguished Service
- 2008 – National Speakers Association Awarded Certified Speaking Professional (CSP) designation
