= French corvette Aréthuse =

Aréthuse
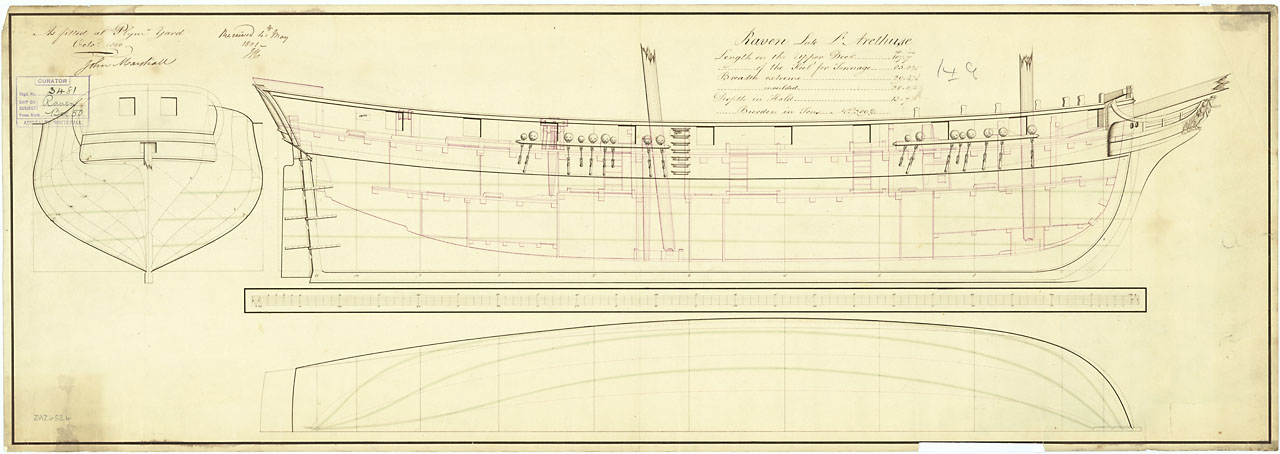
- Raven drawn in 1799

History

France
- Name: Aréthuse
- Namesake: Arethusa
- Builder: Louis and Antoine Crucy, Basse-Indre
- Laid down: October 1797
- Launched: 29 April 1798
- Captured: 10 October 1799

Great Britain
- Name: Raven
- Acquired: 10 October 1799
- Fate: Wrecked on 6 July 1804

General characteristics
- Type: Corvette
- Displacement: 464 tons
- Tons burthen: 38982/94 (bm), 250 (French; "of load")
- Length: 31.18 m (102.3 ft) (overall); 27.93 m (91.6 ft) (keel)
- Beam: 8.93 m (29.3 ft)
- Draught: 3.8 m (12 ft)
- Depth of hold: 4.38 m (14.4 ft)
- Sail plan: Full-rigged ship
- Complement: French service: 136; British service: 96
- Armament: French service: 18 × 8-pounder long guns; British service: 16 × 18-pounder carronades + 2 × 6-pounder bow guns

Aréthuse, launched in April 1798, was the name-ship of the eponymous Aréthuse-class corvettes of the French Navy. Excellent captured her in 1799. The Royal Navy took her into service under the name HMS Raven. She was wrecked in 1804.

== French service ==
Jean-François Gauthier designed her and she was the only vessel of her class. She carried only 18 cannon, though she was designed for 20.

Aréthuse served between France and the Caribbean.

On 9 October 1799 she was under the command of lieutenant de vaisseau Emmanuel Halgan on her way from Lorient for Cayenne with dispatches.

She was sailing towards Impregnable and her convoy when the 74-gun Excellent, which was to windward of Impregnable, spotted her. Excellent chased Aréthuse, catching her during the night. Captain Robert Stopford of Excellent described Aréthuse as having eighteen 9-pounder guns and a crew of 153 men, all under the command of a lieutenant de vaisseau. She was sailing from Lorient to Cayenne with dispatches that she succeeded in destroying before she struck. Excellent shared the capture with Impregnable.

== British service ==
Aréthuse arrived in Plymouth on 26 November 1799. Four hundred French prisoners from Aréthuse and Bourdelaise had landed there two days earlier. (Revolutionnaire had captured Bordelais on 11 October.) Aréthuse was fitted for service with the Royal Navy between September and December 1800. She was commissioned in September 1800 under Commander James Sanders for the Channel. She was recommissioned in June 1802 under Commander Spelman Swaine, (Note: For more on Spelman Swaine see: O'Byrne, William R. (1849). "Swaine, Spelman" . A Naval Biographical Dictionary. London: John Murray.) and in August sailed for the Mediterranean.

== Fate ==
On 4 January 1804 Raven sailed from Malta as escort to the merchant ship Dolphin, bound for Naples. She was following a course along the south coast of Sicily that would take her between the islands of Favignana and Marettimo. In the evening of the next day master's mate Robert Incledon had the watch and saw a light shape in the moonless night. He thought it was a sail but it turned out to be a tower on the cliffs near Mazari, on the south west coast of Sicily. At 11pm she ran aground. Despite efforts to lighten and free her, efforts that extended into the afternoon of 6 January, the pumps were unable to clear the water that was coming in and she had to be abandoned. Dolphin rescued her crew. The court martial on 10 February 1805 admonished the master for having steered too near the land.

== See also ==
- List of ships captured in the 19th century
