= Frederick Cathcart =

British businessman (1859–1934)

- Born: 1859
- Died: 1934 (aged 74–75)
- Occupation: Businessman

Frederick Cathcart (1859–1934) was a British impresario, who was the Clerk of the Course and Chairman of Cheltenham Racecourse from 1908 to 1934. He was responsible for the development of Cheltenham as the world headquarters of National Hunt racing, establishing the Cheltenham Festival as the leading National Hunt event in the racing calendar, and for instigating two of its major races – the Cheltenham Gold Cup and the Champion Hurdle. In 1999, industry paper the Racing Post named him at number 11 in the list of 100 Makers of 20th Century Racing.

He was born in 1859, the son of a professional comedian. He joined racecourse management firm Pratt & Co in 1895 and progressed to be senior partner.

In 1911 he gave the National Hunt Meeting (the precursor to the Cheltenham Festival) a permanent home at Cheltenham and set about expanding it. Under his leadership, the inaugural runnings of the Cheltenham Gold Cup (1924) and Champion Hurdle (1927) were held.

On his death, one obituary read, "He was indefatigable in his efforts to increase the popularity and public appeal of the race meetings with which he was associated ... Much of the success of the 'chasing at Cheltenham was due to Mr Cathcart's energy and enterprise."

The Cathcart Challenge Cup (later replaced by the Ryanair Chase) at the Cheltenham Festival meeting was named in his honour.
