= Pierre-Marie Le Bozec =

French Navy officer (1769–1830)

- Born: 28 April 1769; Île-de-Bréhat
- Died: 15 May 1830 (aged 61); Île-de-Bréhat
- Occupation: French Navy officer

Pierre-Marie Le Bozec (French pronunciation: [pjɛʁ maʁi lə bozɛk]; 28 April 1769, in Île-de-Bréhat – 15 May 1830, in Île-de-Bréhat) was a French Navy officer.

== Biography ==
=== Youth ===
Le Bozec was born to a family of sailors, and started sailing in 1780 on a merchantman. From 1782, he took part in the Naval operations in the American Revolutionary War on the 80-gun Deux Frères, captained by his father.

From 1787 and 1789, he served as second captain on the Comte Esterhazy and the Colombe, and on the Deux Frères again.

=== First Republic ===
Le Bozec was promoted to ensign in 1792. The following year, he was given command of the corvette Vaillante, tasked with escort duties in the English Channel. He was involved in a fight with a British corvette, driving her away. He was promoted to lieutenant the same year.

In early 1794, Le Bozec was awarded command of the brand new 24-gun corvette Républicaine. After a number of patrols in the Channel, he joined up with Lhermitte's squadron, bound for Norway. It comprised the frigates Seine, under Lhermitte, and Galathée, under Labutte.

The squadron found itself blocked by cold and damage in a Norwegian harbour during the entire winter of 1794 - 1795, sustaining over 250 dead from illness out of a total complement of 880. In spring, Seine and Galathée returned to France, leaving Républicaine to care for the untransportable sick. They eventually were rescued by the corvette Subtile.

In the summer and autumn of 1795, Républicaine and Subtile sailed together in a number of short patrols. Le Bozec sustained an injury in a battle against a British frigate.

In March 1796, Le Bozec was promoted to commander and set sail for a patrol off the coasts of Africa and Brazil, capturing 76 prizes. In 1798 it captures the ship Rainha dos Anjos (Queen of Angels) in Maldonado (today, Uruguay). In July 1799, he met the 38-gun HMS Tamar and, after losing all his masts, had to strike his colours.

Le Bozec was exchanged after a few months. In 1801, he was appointed to the 44-gun Clorinde and took part in the campaigns at Santo Domingo under Latouche Tréville.

In March 1803, Le Bozec was promoted to captain and supervised the station of Santo Domingo. He was taken prisoner when the island fell.

=== First Empire ===
Le Bozed was released on parole in the middle of the year 1804, under the promise not to sail for 6 years. Upon his return to France, he was thus tasked with inspection duties between the Seine River and Lorient.

From 1810, he captained the Friedland, in Anvers. From March 1811 to March 1812, he was appointed to Marengo. After this task, he was tasked with the commissioning of the frigate Étoile.

In 1813, was given command of a frigate squadron comprising Aréthuse, Illyrienne and Alcyon, with this flag on Aréthuse. After two patrols, Le Bozec was informed of the abdication of Napoleon and the end of the War of the Sixth Coalition. He consequently freed 11 prizes captured in the preceding weeks.

=== Bourbon restoration ===
On 18 August 1814, Le Bozec was appointed Knight of the Order of Saint Louis. In March 1815, he was appointed to Le Havre. The next year, he was promoted to capitaine de vaisseau de première classe.

In 1817, he commanded a frigate squadron comprising Flore, Coquette and Églantine, with his flag on Flore, in a cruise to the Caribbean and Guyana.

Le Bozec was then Major general of the harbour of Cherbourg, before retiring in 1822. He was made an honorary contre-amiral.

== Sources and references ==
- A propos d'un illustre bréhatin : le contre-amiral Le Bozec par Yves De Sagazan – Les Carnets du Goëlo n°1 (1985), bulletin de la Société d'études historiques et archéologique du Goëlo
- Dictionnaire des capitaines de vaisseau de Napoléon par Danièle et Bernard Quintin, S.P.M. Paris 2003

- Susana Sarfson "Hallazgo de la partitura de un Amable y Minuet en un expediente legal de 1799 de los legajos de esclavos del Archivo General de la Nación en Buenos Aires", Revista de Musicología Vol. 31, No. 2 (Diciembre 2008), pp. 435–452.

https://www.jstor.org/stable/20797931?seq=1#page_scan_tab_contents
