= Sally Hogshead =

American writer

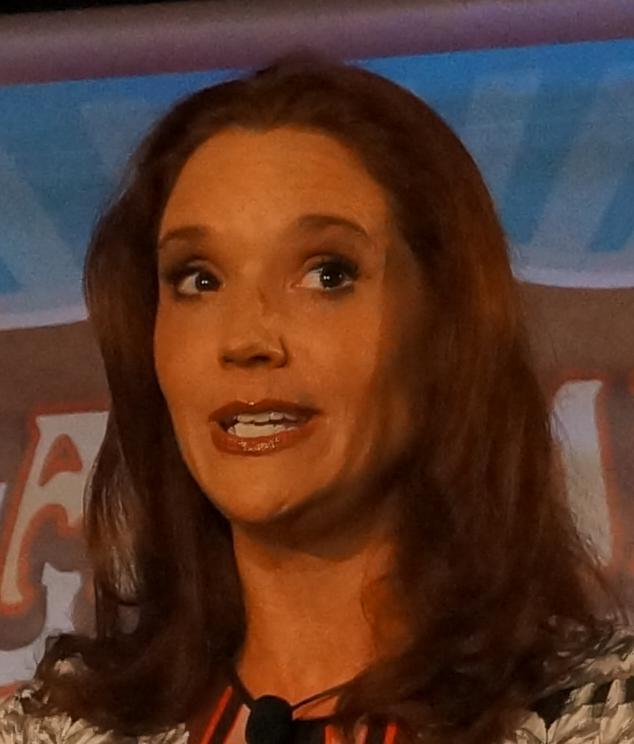
- Sally Hogshead, in 2013
- Occupations: Author, public speaker
- Known for: Author of How The World Sees You

Sally Hogshead is a New York Times bestselling author, National Speakers Association Hall of Fame speaker, chief executive officer of How to Fascinate (Fascinate, Inc) and a former advertising executive.

== Career ==
Hogshead attended Duke University, from which she graduated in 1991. Her first job was with advertising agency Fallon Worldwide, which employed her as a junior copywriter. Subsequently, Hogshead worked as a copywriter for Wieden+Kennedy and The Martin Agency. When the Martin Agency closed its Los Angeles office in 1998, Hogshead and Jean Robaire, with whom she had worked at Martin, opened their own agency, Robaire and Hogshead. Agency clients included Rémy Martin and Target Corporation.

In 2001 Hogshead was hired to open a new office of Crispin Porter + Bogusky in Venice, California, where she served as both managing and creative directors.

Hogshead was inducted into the National Speakers Association's Speaker Hall of Fame in 2012.

=== Books ===
Gotham Books published Hogshead's Radical Careering: 100 Truths to Jumpstart Your Job, Your Career, and Your Life in 2005. The book's conclusions are putatively supported by research done with 1,000 Generation X professionals.

In 2010, HarperCollins published Hogshead's book, Fascinate: Your 7 Triggers to Persuasion and Captivation. The book came out of research that she started in 2006, in which she had over 100,000 people take personality tests. The tests focused on "a variety of fields and levels of professional achievements."

Fascinate: Your 7 Triggers to Persuasion and Captivation was reviewed by Publishers Weekly and described as having "an uneven start" but in the end it "packs a big punch." Another reviewer wondered "how smaller firms and individuals can apply this stuff to their work and live. [...] It would seem like artifice and inauthenticity, perhaps, to a small businessperson who's already in perpetual survival mode."

In 2014, HarperCollins published Hogshead's book, How the World Sees You: Discover Your Highest Value Through the Science of Fascination. It was on the New York Times Bestseller List.

In 2016, HarperCollins published Fascinate, Revised and Updated which took the existing Fascination Advantage Assessment, and applied it for use in small businesses. It was on the New York Times Bestseller List, and a #1 Wall Street Journal Best Seller.

=== The Fascination Advantage ===
Hogshead commissioned the Kelton Global to research why some brands are more captivating than others. They identified seven ways a person's interest can be stimulated. In 2010, Hogshead developed an assessment to measure how an individual ranked on these seven "triggers." Positioned against other assessments that measured one's worldview, this test aims to show how one is perceived by others. The test has been featured on Fast Company.

The assessment was called the "F Score," which is a personality test used to determine one's personality archetype out of 49 "archetypes." The test is now called "The Fascination Advantage Assessment." She also tested the audiences at the Million Dollar Round Table and National Association of Insurance and Financial Advisors conferences.

=== Development History ===
Hogshead commissioned the study in 2007 to Kelton Global. The study found that there are seven ways in which a person's brain can be captivated. Initially the research was applied to show how different brands captured audiences attention. Hogshead applied this research in the 2009 book Fascinate. The book applied the research from the study and introduced the concept "triggers," which are different ways brands get attention.

In 2010, the research was applied to people instead of brands. The test showed how a person measured against the triggers. The initial assessment was called the "F Score." The results presented the user with ways to use their top communications styles in their everyday lives.

In 2014, Hogshead released her next book How the World Sees You. This book was built around the F-Score test, now abridged and targeted towards professionals. The assessment was re-titled "The Fascination Advantage."

=== The System ===
The idea of the assessment is based on Hogshead's concept of "fascination" which she describes as a state of intense intellectual focus. The assessment serves as a guide to show individuals how to communicate better using their best-suited triggers, or Advantages. The test treats the individual as though he or she were a brand.

The assessment consists of 28 questions that rank the user on the seven advantages of the system. At the end of the assessment, the user is presented with their best and worst methods of communication.

The questions are worded to find what social cues someone gives off. The results are based on the Kelton research of how others view these traits in brands. After the assessment, the individual is given a report explaining their communication-style and given a personality archetype. The archetypes are a short-hand for a user's results.

== Personal life ==
Hogshead is married and has two children and six step children. She lives in Orlando, Florida.

== Bibliography ==
- How the World Sees You: Discover Your Highest Value Through the Science of Fascination. New York: HarperBusiness (2014). ISBN 9780062230690
- Fascinate: Your 7 Triggers to Persuasion and Captivation. New York: HarperBusiness (2010). ISBN 0061714704
- Radical Careering : 100 Truths to Jumpstart Your Job, Your Career, and Your Life. New York: Gotham (2005). ISBN 1592401503
- Fascinate, Revised and Updated: How to Make Your Brand Impossible to Resist. New York: HarperBusiness (2016). ISBN 1504696875
