= Royal Cathcart =

American football player (1926–2012)

No. 94
- Position: Halfback

Personal information
- Born: April 8, 1926; Canute, Oklahoma, U.S.
- Died: February 5, 2012 (aged 85); Newport Beach, California, U.S.
- Listed height: 6 ft 0 in (1.83 m)
- Listed weight: 185 lb (84 kg)

Career information
- High school: Long Beach (CA) Polytechnic
- College: UC Santa Barbara

Career history
- San Francisco 49ers (1950)

Career statistics
- Games played: 2
- Stats at Pro Football Reference

Royal Jenesen Cathcart (April 8, 1926 – February 5, 2012) was an American football halfback who played for the San Francisco 49ers. He played college football at the University of California, Santa Barbara, having previously attended Long Beach Polytechnic High School in Long Beach, California. He was the brother of Sam Cathcart, who also played for the 49ers. Cathcart also was a line judge and side judge in the National Football League (NFL) for 16 seasons from 1971 through 1986, wearing uniform number 16.
