= French ship Friedland (1810) =

Ship of the line of the French Navy

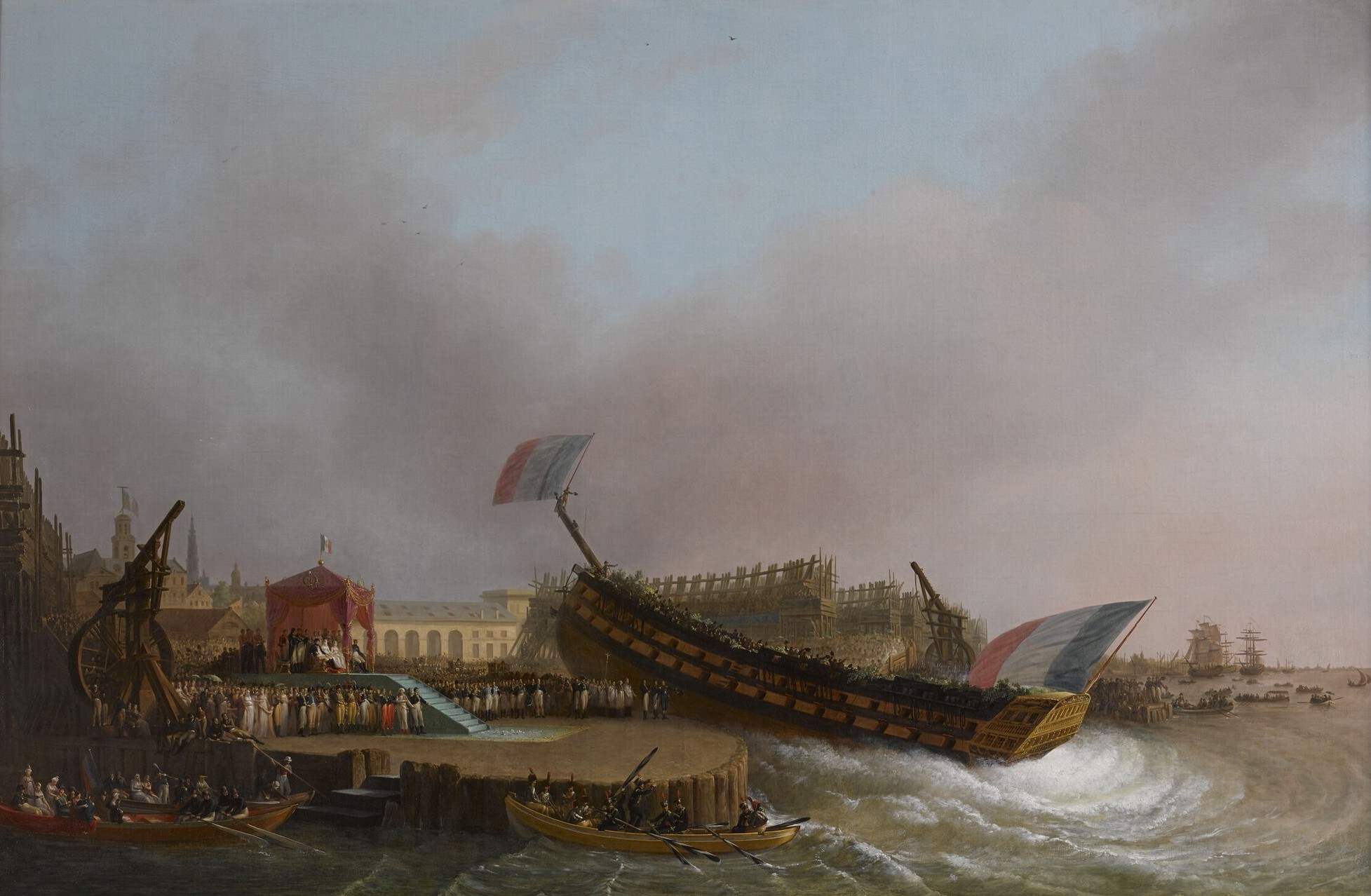
- Napoleon I and Marie Louise, together with Jérôme Bonaparte and Catharina of Württemberg, witnessing the launching of Friedland at the arsenal of Antwerp

History

France
- Name: Friedland
- Namesake: Battle of Friedland
- Ordered: June 1807
- Builder: Holland
- Laid down: 1807
- Launched: 2 May 1810
- In service: 4 January 1811
- Stricken: 1814
- Fate: Acquired by Holland, broken up 1823

General characteristics
- Class & type: Bucentaure-class ship of the line
- Displacement: 3,868 tonneaux
- Tons burthen: 2,034 port tonneaux
- Length: 59.28 m (194 ft 6 in)
- Beam: 15.27 m (50 ft 1 in)
- Draught: 7.8 m (25 ft 7 in)
- Depth of hold: 7.64 m (25 ft 1 in)
- Sail plan: Full-rigged ship
- Crew: 866 (wartime)
- Armament: 80 guns: Lower gun deck: 30 × 36 pdr guns; Upper gun deck: 32 × 24 pdr guns; Forecastle and Quarterdeck: 14 × 12 pdr guns & 14 × 36 pdr carronades

Friedland was a 3rd rank, 90-gun Bucentaure-class ship of the line built for the French Navy during the first decade of the 19th century. Completed in 1811, she played a minor role in the Napoleonic Wars.

== Description ==
Designed by Jacques-Noël Sané, the Bucentaure-class ships had a length of 59.28 metres (194 ft 6 in), a beam of 15.27 metres (50 ft 1 in) and a depth of hold of 7.64 metres (25 ft 1 in). The ships displaced 3,868 tonneaux and had a mean draught of 7.8 metres (25 ft 7 in). They had a tonnage of 2,034 port tonneaux. Their crew numbered 866 officers and ratings during wartime. They were fitted with three masts and ship rigged.

The muzzle-loading, smoothbore armament of the Bucentaure class consisted of thirty 36-pounder long guns on the lower gun deck and thirty-two 24-pounder long guns on the upper gun deck. The armament on the quarterdeck and forecastle varied as the ships' authorised armament was changed over the years that the Bucentares were built. Friedland was fitted with fourteen 12-pounder long guns and fourteen 36-pounder carronades.

== Construction and career ==
Friedland was ordered on 2 June 1807 as a 74-gun ship of the line with the name Illustre, but this was revised to an 90-gun ship on 9 July and the ship was renamed Friedland on 28 July. She was laid down that same month in Antwerp. Napoleon and his wife, Marie Louise, Duchess of Parma, attended her launching on 2 May 1810. Friedland was commissioned on 4 January 1811 by Captain Pierre-Marie Le Bozec and completed in May. The ship was assigned to the Scheldt Squadron in February 1812. She was transferred to the Royal Netherlands Navy as war reparations under the terms the Treaty of Fontainebleau of 1814. Renamed Vlaming, she was broken up in 1823.
