= Sam Cathcart =

American football player (1924–2015)

- Sam Cathcart in 1949

No. 83, 28
- Position: Halfback / Defensive back

Personal information
- Born: July 7, 1924; Canute, Oklahoma, U.S.
- Died: April 3, 2015 (aged 90); Santa Barbara, California, U.S.
- Listed height: 6 ft 0 in (1.83 m)
- Listed weight: 175 lb (79 kg)

Career information
- High school: Long Beach (CA) Polytechnic
- College: UC Santa Barbara

Career history
- San Francisco 49ers (1949–1950, 1952)
- Stats at Pro Football Reference

Samuel Woodrow "Sam" Cathcart (July 7, 1924 – April 3, 2015) was an American football halfback and defensive back who played for the San Francisco 49ers. He played college football at the University of California, Santa Barbara, having previously attended Long Beach Polytechnic High School in Long Beach, California. He was the brother of Royal Cathcart, who also played for the 49ers. He died of cancer in hospital in 2015.
