= Glasgow Cathcart =

Glasgow Cathcart may refer to:

- Glasgow Cathcart (UK Parliament constituency)
- Glasgow Cathcart (Scottish Parliament constituency)
