= Jim Cathcart =

American entrepreneur, speaker and author

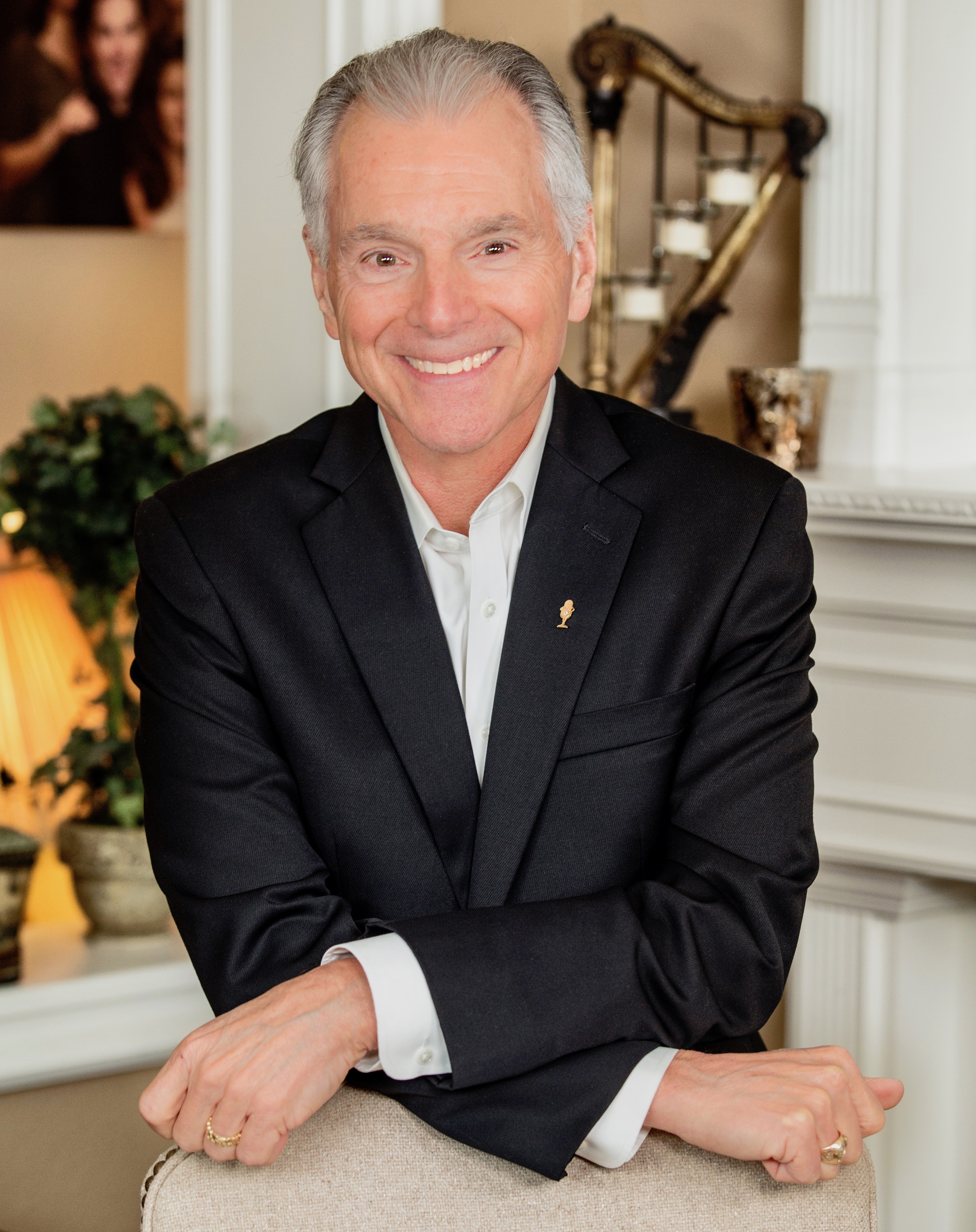
- Helping People Grow since 1977
- Born: Little Rock, Arkansas
- Education: High Point University
- Occupations: Entrepreneur, author, speaker
- Known for: Motivational speaker and author
- Website: Cathcart.com

Jim Cathcart is an American entrepreneur, speaker and author.

== Career ==
Cathcart has authored 28 books (including "What To Do When You Are The Speaker", "Mentor Minutes: Reach the Top 1% of Any Field", "HI-REV for Small Business", "Intelligent Curiosity", Relationship Selling and The Acorn Principle) and numerous recorded programs while traveling internationally to provide speeches at seminars, conferences, and workshops. He is a TEDx presenter and serves as a strategic advisor and consultant. Cathcart is the original author and creator of the concept of Relationship Selling. He is a Certified Speaking Professional (CSP) from the National Speakers Association.

In the years 2015 through 2024, Cathcart delivered scores of presentations all over mainland China on behalf of World Masters Speakers Bureau (Dr. David Chu) based near Shanghai in the Song Jiang province. He spoke in 25 cities to tens of thousands of young business people and business owners. He also recorded a musical album "Fireside Songs" (19 songs) while in Taipei, Taiwan. His books, The Self Motivation Handbook, Relationship Selling and You Are The Speaker have been translated into Chinese and published there. He conducted a year long academy program called "Skyliners Academy" with seminars in Thames Town, Li Jiang, Shanghai and on Yangtze River Cruises. In 2019 he traveled to China for 6 separate lecture tours, 71 days in country.

After 37 years in California, he moved Cathcart Institute to Austin, Texas in 2020. His primary activities during Covid19 were Mentorship for Small Groups of High Achievers via Zoom and telephone plus weekly podcasts, interviews, webinars and articles. As part of The Cathcart Institute Professional Experts Academy™ he conducts the 6 month Mentorship program "The Going Pro Experts Experience." They have now certified 40 independent experts with the Certified Professional Expert, CPE designation. <www.cathcart.com/cpe>

Television and Video: Jim Cathcart has created multiple video programs and courses. In late 2022 TomeApp.com produced 2 video courses featuring Jim Cathcart: Professional Growth: Acorns to Oak Trees published in early 2023. In early 2022 Biz Library out of St. Louis, MO published Professional Selling, a 30 lesson video course by Jim Cathcart. McCuistionTV.com produces a PBS TV show on KERA in Dallas, Texas that has been on the air for over 35 years. Jim Cathcart was added as a cohost on this show beginning in early 2022. He can also be seen daily on Thrive15.com and TSTN.com while he also gives weekly radio interviews. Cathcart has been published and quoted in numerous media outlets including San Fernando Valley Business Journal, Pacific Coast Business Times, Investor's Business Daily, Townhall.com, and Huffington Post.

== Awards and honors ==
On September 25, 2021, Jim Cathcart received an Honorary Bachelor of Science in Business Administration degree from High Point University in North Carolina. This was due to his 21 published books, 3,300 professional speeches and career of leadership and contributions in professional education. Cathcart was inducted into the Sales & Marketing Hall of Fame in 2012 for his lifetime of work associated with his book and concept of Relationship Selling. He is listed in the Professional Speakers Hall of Fame, is a recipient of the Golden Gavel Award, has been the president of the National Speakers Association and received their Cavett Award for a lifetime of service. The San Diego chapter of the National Speakers Association renamed their member of the year award "The Jim Cathcart Service Award" and the Greater Los Angeles chapter gave him their Lifetime Achievement Award in 2003. In 2008, he was inducted as one of the "Legends of the Speaking Profession." In the 2025 ranking of Top 30 Global Gurus, Mr. Cathcart was ranked No. 5 in Motivational Programs and 29th in Sales Gurus worldwide. Also in 2022, he was chosen as the keynote speaker for Toastmasters International's convention August 17, 2022 in Nashville, Tennessee. This is his third main stage keynote for Toastmasters International starting in 1996, then 2001 and now 2022. He is not a member of Toastmasters.

He was selected as one of the Top 5 Sales & Customer Service Speakers by Speaking.com (2010, 2011, 2012, 2013, and 2014) and was listed as one of Top 50 Sales Influencers in the World by Top Sales World (2014, 2015, and 2016). He was named among a listing of Top 25 Speakers (2015, 2016, 2017) selected by over 27,000 voting. Listed in Top 25 Speakers of 2022 by iDominate Speaker Magazine in July 2022.

== Background ==
Cathcart is a graduate of Arkansas Military Academy and attended the University of Arkansas at Little Rock. He is also a singer, songwriter, and guitarist. He has served as an Artist in Residence for High Point University and on the Dean's Advisory Council to the School of Management at California Lutheran University, where he is also their first Entrepreneur in Residence.

He is also a former board member of the Boys & Girls Clubs of Greater Conejo Valley. In 1975–77, he served as the Senior Program Manager for Individual Development (programs) for the United States Junior Chamber of Commerce, The Jaycees.

== Selected bibliography ==
- Cathcart, Jim (2023) "What To Do When You're The Speaker, The Cathcart Method for Confident Communication." publisher: Cathcart Press. 158 pages. ISBN 978-1-63792-564-5
- Cathcart, Jim (2023) "Mentor Minutes: Reach The Top 1% Of Any Field." publisher: Cathcart Press. 268 pages. ISBN 978-1-63792-482-2
- Madden, Dennis and Jim Cathcart. (2022) "Hi-Rev for Small Business, A Faster Way to Profits." publisher: Beyond Publishing. 152 pages. ISBN 978-1-63792-349-8
- Cathcart, Jim (with Lisa Patrick). (2021) "Intelligent Curiosity, The Art of Finding More." publisher: Beyond Publishing. 168 pages. ISBN 978-1-63792-123-4
- Cathcart, Jim (with Tony Alessandra and John Monoky) (1990). "Be Your Own Sales Manager: Strategies And Tactics For Managing Your Accounts, Your Territory, And Yourself". New York, NY: Touchstone. pp. 276 pages. ISBN 978-0-671-76175-2.
- Cathcart, Jim (1999). "The Acorn Principle: Know Yourself, Grow Yourself". New York, NY: St. Martin's Griffin. pp. 214 pages. ISBN 978-0-312-24284-8.
- Cathcart, Jim (2002). "The Eight Competencies of Relationship Selling". New York, NY: Leading Authorities Press. pp. 240 pages. ISBN 978-0-9710078-1-9.
- Cathcart, Jim (2010). "Relationship Selling: The eight competencies of top sales producers". Thousand Oaks, CA: Cathcart Institute, Inc. pp. 320 pages. ASIN B004AYD92S.
- Cathcart, Jim (2016). "The Self-Motivation Handbook". Carlsbad, CA: Motivational Press, Inc. pp. 306 pages. ISBN 978-1-62865-313-7.
- Cathcart, Jim (2020). "The Power Minute: Your motivation handbook for activating your dreams and transforming your life." Highlands Ranch, CO: Authors Place Press. pp. 301 pages. ISBN 978-1-62865-633-6.
