= Morris Barnett =

British actor

Morris Barnett (1800 – 18 March 1856), was a British actor and dramatist.

== Biography ==
Born into a Jewish family, Barnett was originally brought up to the musical profession. The earlier part of his life was passed in Paris. Having resolved to adopt the stage as a profession, he went as a comedian to Brighton and thence to Bath. In 1833 he was engaged by Alfred Bunn for Drury Lane Theatre, when he made his first great hit in the part of Tom Drops in Douglas Jerrold's comedy 'The Schoolfellows.' He showed his peculiar talents in 'Capers and Coronets,’ and after this he wrote, and performed the title rôle in, 'Monsieur Jacques,’ a musical piece, which in 1837 created a furore at the St. James's Theatre. As a delineator of French character he obtained a celebrity in which, save by Mr. Wigan (Alfred Wigan?), he was unrivalled. After a period devoted chiefly to literary pursuits, he reappeared on the stage of the Princess's Theatre, where his 'Old Guard,’ in the piece of that name, attracted general attention. He then joined the literary staff of the 'Morning Post' and the 'Era,’ of which papers he was the musical critic for nearly seven years. In September 1854 he resolved to go to America, and before his departure gave a series of farewell performances at the Adelphi Theatre. The transatlantic trip was not successful. A period of severe ill-health deprived him of the power of exercising his abilities. He at last sank under the effects of his long illness, and died on 18 March 1856 at Montreal.

== Notable Performances ==
As a dramatist he acquired celebrity by the comedy of The Serious Family, which he adapted from Jean-François Bayard's Le Mari à la Campagne. Among his other pieces are Lilian Gervais, a drama in three acts, adapted from the French play of J. E. Alboize de Pujol and Édouard Déaddé, entitled Marie Simon; Married and Un-married, a drama; The Bold Dragoons, a comic drama; Circumstantial Evidence, a comic piece; and Mrs G. of the Golden Pippin, a petite opera.
