= Emmanuel Halgan =

French Navy officer, politician and colonial administrator (1771–1852)

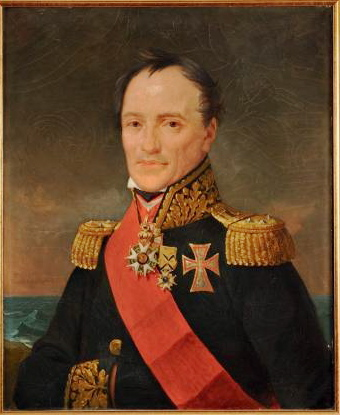
1850 portrait of Halgan

Vice-Admiral Emmanuel Halgan (31 December 1771 – 20 April 1852) was a French Navy officer, politician and colonial administrator who served as the governor of Martinique from 1834 to 1836.

== Life ==
Born to the family of a bailiff, Halgan joined the French Navy aged 16. He then served as a lieutenant and first officer on merchantmen. After rejoining the Navy, he served aboard the brig Curieux, captured by a British frigate in 1793. Halgan was taken prisoner. Upon his return to France, he served on the Terrible and on a number of other ships. In 1798, Halgan received command of Aréthuse. The next year, Aréthuse was dismasted and captured by the 74-gun Excellent, off Portugal. The Royal Navy took Aréthuse into service as HMS Raven. In 1800, Halgan was tasked with commissioning Clorinde, and then served as first officer on Clorinde as she was sent to Saint-Domingue.

Upon his return to France, Halgan received command of the brig Épervier, with ensign Jérôme Bonaparte under his orders. In Martinique, Halgan took temporary command of the 20-gun Berceau. He sailed to France, and in 1803, sailed to the Indian Ocean to warn of the outbreak of the War of the Third Coalition. At Mauritius, he joined up with Linois' squadron, engaging in commerce raiding. Berceau captured the 1500-ton Countess of Sutherland and on 3 December along with Motard's Sémillante destroyed outposts at Pulo Bay, which was about eight miles from Bencoolen. Sailing towards the Sea of China, Halgan persuaded Linois to sail through the Gaspar Strait, of which he had studied recent maps. The French squadron then met a 26-ship convoy of the East India Company, leading to the Battle of Pulo Aura.

Promoted to capitaine de frégate, Halgan was sent to France and received command of the frigate Cybèle, but was then ordered to embark on the Vétéran instead, under Prince Jérôme Bonaparte. In 1809, Halgan captained the Heureuse during the Battle of the Basque Roads. Heureuse was amongst the survivors of the battle. In December 1813, with three companies of sailors and a fraction of the crews of his ships, Halgan defended the fortress of Hellevoetsluis, in Holland, against the attacks of several thousands insurgents. The French-held fortresses were later ordered abandoned due to the advances of the Allies, and the Meuse flotilla was scuttled in Willemstad. Halgan retreated to Anvers. When Anvers was shelled, he defended the harbour and helped preserve the ships and the naval installations.

After the Bourbon Restoration in France, Helgan was given command of the Superbe, sailing to the Caribbean. Halgan the supervised the naval divisions of the Levant and of America. In 1819, he was nominated director for personnel at the Ministry of the Navy. He later returned to Levant to command a squadron, before returning to his office at the Ministry in 1824 and serving at the Council of State. From 1819 to 1830, he sat in the Chamber of Deputies. In 1830, he presided the Commission of Naval Signals. From 1834 to 1836, he served as the governor of Martinique. In 1837, he was made general inspector of the Harbours of the Ocean, and a Peer of France. After retiring on 24 June 1841, by then a vice-admiral, Halgan was promoted to Grand Cross of the Legion of Honour. The genus Halgania of small shrubs in the family Boraginaceae, which are native to Australia, was named in his honour.
