= Jane R. Cathcart =

American clubwoman

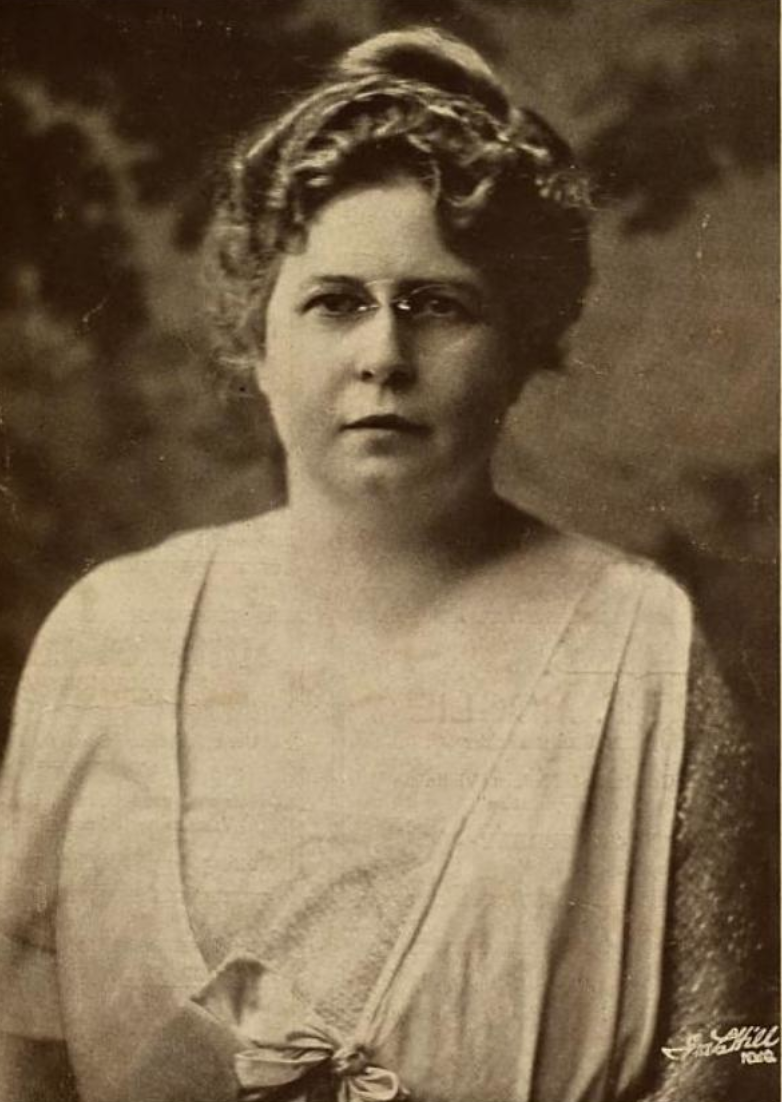
- Jane Cathcart, from a 1922 publication
- Born: Jane Rhett Cathcart; June 18, 1874; New York, New York, U.S.
- Died: April 30, 1947 (age 72); Hasbrouck Heights, New Jersey, U.S.
- Other names: Jennie Cathcart
- Occupations: Clubwoman, pianist, music teacher
- Known for: Founder and president, Washington Heights Musical Club, and the Short-Haired Cat Society of America
- Partner: Ethel Grow

Jane Rhett Cathcart (June 18, 1874 – April 30, 1947) was an American pianist, music teacher, and clubwoman. She was a prominent cat fancier, as founder and president of the Short-Haired Cat Society of America. She was the founder and president of the Washington Heights Musical Club.

== Early life and education ==
Cathcart was born in New York City, the daughter of George Rhett Cathcart and Jane M. Cathcart. Her father was an editor and general manager of the American Book Company; he died in 1892. Her mother died in 1894.

== Career ==
=== Cats ===
Cathcart was founder and president of the Short-Haired Cat Society of America in 1906. She owned show cats, bred and sheltered cats on her farm in New Jersey, and imported cats from England for Americans interested in particular breeds. She campaigned for stray cat management.

=== Music ===
In the 1920s, Cathcart was a pianist and music teacher in New York City. She shared a studio with her partner, contralto Ethel Grow. She also composed popular songs.

Cathcart was founder and president of the Washington Heights Musical Club. The club organized concerts and recitals at the Plaza Hotel, Aeolian Hall, and other venues, and held meetings were members performed for members, and where teachers and students discussed music pedagogy. Ruth Kemper was the club's vice-president. The club's junior branch encouraged musical interest and skills in school-age children. The club had members in Chicago, Detroit, and Providence. She resigned as the club's president in 1930.

== Personal life ==
Cathcart lived in New Jersey, where she had a farm in Oradell and a home in Hasbrouck Heights. She lived with Ethel Grow for almost thirty years, and maintained a home in Paris before World War I. Fellow pianist Carolyn Beebe was a guest at her summer cottage in 1925. She died in 1947, in Hasbrouck Heights, at the age of 72.
