= Leave the Office Earlier =

2004 book by Laura Stack

- Author: Laura Stack
- Language: English
- Publisher: Random House
- Publication date: 2004
- Publication place: United States
- Media type: Print
- Pages: 300
- ISBN: 978-0767916264

Leave the Office Earlier is a self-help book by Laura Stack focusing on time management. It was published in 2004 by Random House. The book explores ten key factors that improve results, lower stress, and save time in the workplace.

== Background ==
Stack is an American executive, author, and speaker focused in the fields of time management and workplace productivity. She is the president of The Productivity Pro, Inc. and is known by the moniker "The Productivity Pro". Stack is the author of seven books including Leave the Office Earlier, and began the "National Leave the Office Early Day".

== Reception ==
A review by Publishers Weekly stated "Quoting a 2003 workplace study by COGNA Behavioral Health called "Worried at Work: Mood and Mindset in the American Workplace," Stack argues that workers are stressed to epidemic proportions. Building on the platform of the acronym "PRODUCTIVE," Stack, who holds an MBA and gives inspirational speeches, introduces 10 quizzes and consecutive chapters based on the productivity factors: preparation, reduction, order, discipline, unease, concentration, time mastery, information and equilibrium. By combining fill-in-the-blanks charts and lists with her established techniques, Stark presents a method of organization that can be individualized and effective."

In their book The 25 Best Time Management Tools & Techniques, Pamela Dodd and Doug Sundheim rank Leave the Office Earlier third on their list of "The Best Time Management Books". while The New York Times deemed “the best book of the bunch" of time management books it reviewed in June 2004.
