= Fanny Cathcart =

English-born Australian stage actress

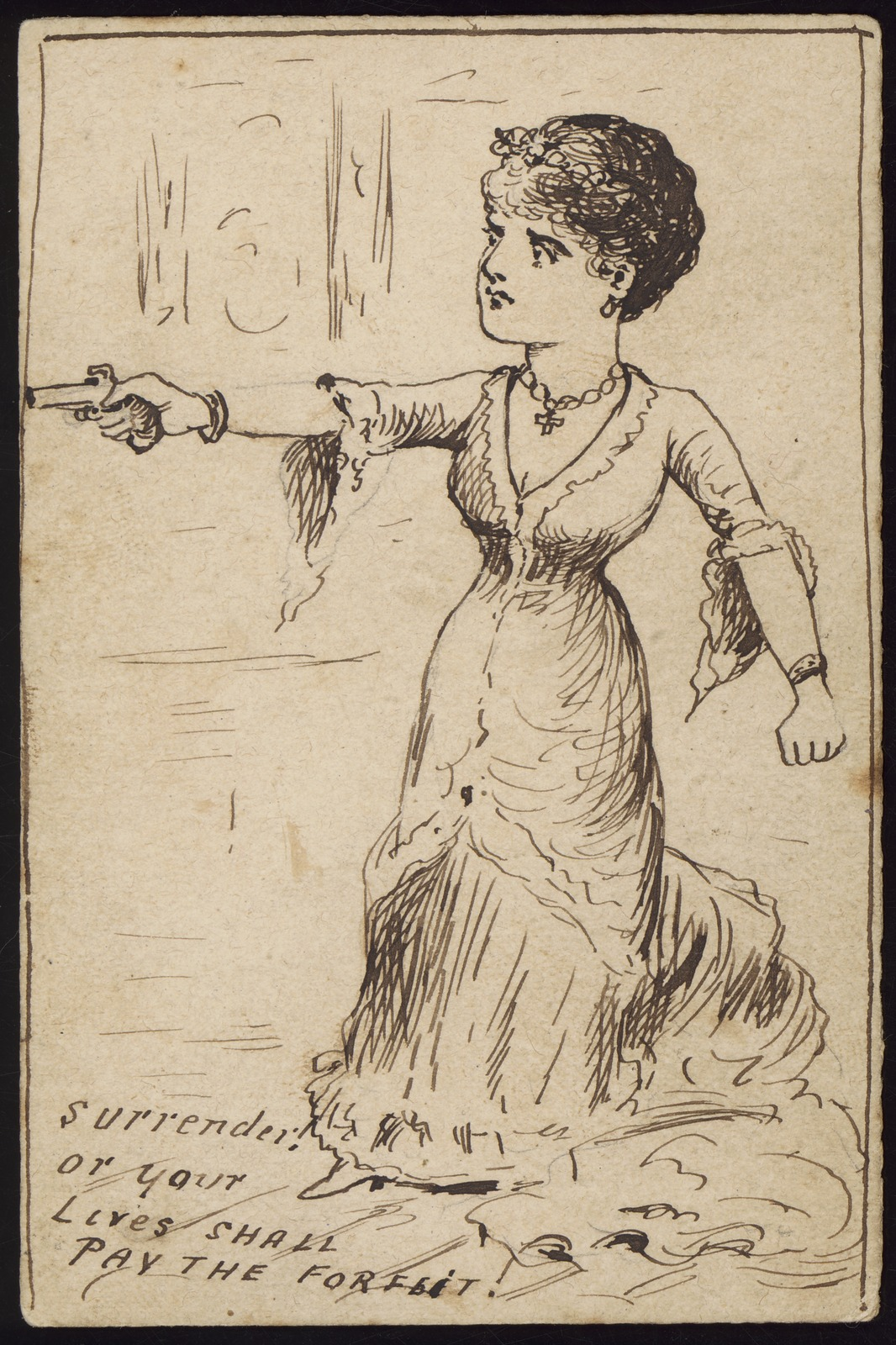
- Fanny Cathcart, c. 1870
- Born: Mary Fanny Cathcart; 3 August 1833; London, England
- Died: 3 January 1880 (aged 46); Carlton, Victoria, Australia
- Other names: Mrs Robert Heir, Mrs George Darrell
- Occupation: actress
- Years active: 1850–1879
- Known for: Comedy and Shakespearean roles

Mary Fanny Cathcart (3 August 1833 – 3 January 1880), was an Australian stage actress, active between 1853 and 1878. Between 1855 and 1865, she was regarded as the most famed female theatre star in Australia.

Cathcart was born in England on 3 August 1833 to James Cathcart and Fannie Hubbard. Her father was the manager of his own touring theatre company. She arrived in Melbourne in Australia as a member of Gustavus Brooke's travelling theatre company in 1853. The same year, she married the actor Robert James Heir. He died in 1868 at sea on a voyage to New Zealand aged 36. In 1870 she married playwright George Darrell in Auckland, New Zealand.

Cathcart was famous in mid 19th-century Australia for both her comedy and Shakespearean roles. She was admired for her precise attention to detail in her acting and described as a talented beauty. She had her base in Melbourne but toured all over Australia and was given jewels by her audience.

Cathcart died at her home in the Melbourne suburb of Carlton on 3 January 1880, survived by her second husband. She was buried in the Melbourne General Cemetery. The actor James Faucett Cathcart ( –1902) was a brother.

Cathcart Close in the Canberra suburb of Chisholm is named in her honour.
