= Fred Younge =

English comic actor (1825–1870)

Frederick George Younge (12 February 1825 – 6 December 1870) was an English comic actor, in Australia for six years.

== History ==
Younge was born in London, a son of Richard and Sarah Elizabeth Younge. Younge and his wife Emma arrived in Melbourne in February 1858 by the ship Norfolk, first playing at the Theatre Royal, Melbourne, where his first success was as the butler "Blenkinsopp", in Tom Taylor's An Unequal Match, starring Ellen Mortyn in the role in which Lillie Langtry made her American debut in 1882. He was a "hit" in a burlesque of Lalla Rookh as the villain "Khorsambad", not found in the poem, and "portrayed with the broadest of pencils and the strongest of colours". and James Planché's The Yellow Dwarf, though he and Miss Mortimer were badly let down by the rest of the cast and the show closed after a few nights.

He left the Theatre Royal in May 1859, having leased the Olympic Theatre in conjunction with his brother R. Younge. His farewell benefit was disrupted by the band refusing to play, Younge having advertised that the bands of the two theatres would appear together. The ill-feeling between the two managements was still evident two months later when G. V. Brooke scotched plans to combine funds raised by the two theatres to benefit the daughter of Ellen Mortyn, who died 22 June 1859. At his own benefit he played a farce, The Windmill in September 1859,

Melbourne's theatres were in a bind: because the play-going public was small in number, turnover of plays had to be rapid so the cost of mounting a new production could not be spread over weeks or months. Prevailing wisdom was that three theatres was one too many. Presentations at The Olympic in its first three months included Falconer's Extremes, Fitzball's The World and Stage, Boucicault's Janet Pride, Byron's Mazeppa and Brough's burlesque Medea. A partial solution was to take the productions to country areas: the gold-mining towns had an appetite for theatre and didn't mind spending money on a good show. Younge also had six seasons in New South Wales in the period 1862–1865.

"A Determined Dogberry"
The Sydney telegram in Tuesday's Argus informs us that " A criminal information has been laid against Mr FRED. YOUNGE, the actor, by Alderman ASHWORTH, of Bathurst, for impersonating him as an ass in a local farce." Let the Bathurst Alderman — think of a Bathurst Alderman ! — file an information for libel against himself forthwith. Mr Younge represented him as an ass before the people of Bathurst only, but he has represented himself as one before the entire public of Australia.

He also played several times in Queensland: Brisbane at Mason's Hall in J. M. Morton's All That Glitters Is Not Gold in March 1865. Mr and Mrs Younge left for England in 1865; his last Melbourne appearance was in Taylor and Reade's Masks and Faces, but they subsequently appeared in Brisbane a few times with brother Richard, who had a hotel in that city.

They left Melbourne by the ship Suffolk on 30 April 1865, returning to England. They had a successful season with Marie Wilton, at the Prince of Wales' Theatre, off Tottenham Court Road, then formed a touring company to present four plays by his friend T. W. Robertson: Caste, in which he played "d'Alroy", Play, School, and Ours. It was while playing in Sunderland that he lost his life in a train crash, an event his friends assert he had envisaged, and the way he wanted to go — sudden and unforeseen.

=== The train crash ===
On 6 December 1870 the 10:30 express train from Sunderland to Newcastle was passing the Brockley Whins station on the North-Eastern Railway, when it collided head-on with a coal train which had been on the way from Newcastle to the Tyne Dock. It had been inadvertently switched onto the main line through a blunder by the pointsman. The two locomotives were destroyed as well as first couple of carriages of the express which were thrown upwards, four passengers being killed and many seriously injured, one subsequently dying. Apart from Younge, the other fatalities Henry Richardson, W. B. Odgen, and J. C. Turnbull were all Sunderland residents. Herbert Taplin, the guard of the express train, was the fifth fatality.

== Family ==
Younge married the Irish singer Emma Jane Corri in Dublin on 19 December 1852. A daughter of Haydn Corri and granddaughter of Domenico Corri, she had successes in Australia both with her husband's company and independently. They had a daughter Nellie in Melbourne on 24 December 1858. She married again, in 1875, to one James Gardner.

He had two brothers, both active in theatre in Australia around the same time:

- Richard William Younge (c. 1821 – 5 June 1887) arrived in Melbourne 23 February 1855 with the G. V. Brooke company under contract to G. Coppin, and played Iago to Brooke's Othello at the Queen's Theatre, Melbourne five days later. He was the Olympic Theatre's first stage manager, for a time in partnership with brother Fred. He married Margaret Davis in Melbourne in 1863. He and his wife ran the Royal Hotel, Queen Street, Brisbane 1864–1867. He returned to England and pursued his theatrical career until a few years before his death. He was lessee of the Tyne Theatre, Newcastle, in 1886.
- Francis Rusden "Frank" Younge, a.k.a. Frank Harlowe (c. 1829 – 7 November 1871) was in Australia 1860–1866. A notable production in which he appeared, as "Wagner", was Barry Sullivan's grand revival of Faust and Marguerite, adapted from Michel Carré's Faust et Marguerite, at the Theatre Royal on 16 April 1864.
