= French frigate Clorinde (1800) =

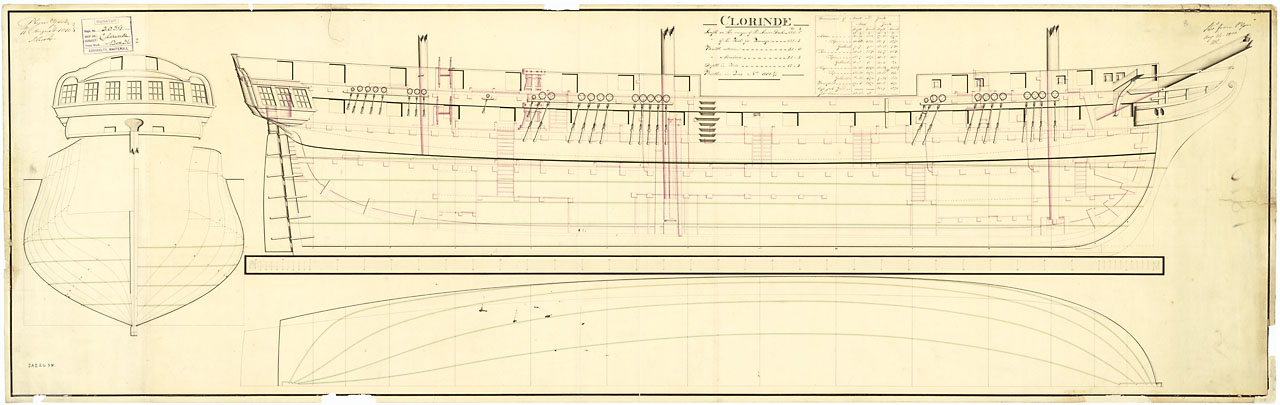
- Clorinde

History

France
- Name: Clorinde
- Namesake: Clorinda
- Builder: Nantes
- Laid down: 24 September 1796
- Launched: 31 October 1800
- In service: 27 June 1801
- Captured: 30 November 1803

United Kingdom
- Name: Clorinde
- Acquired: 30 November 1803
- Fate: Broken up in 1817

General characteristics
- Displacement: 1,350 tons (French)
- Tons burthen: 1161 54/94 (bm)
- Length: 47.3 m (155 ft), or; 158 ft 6 in (48.3 m) (overall); 133 ft 2 in (40.6 m) (keel)
- Beam: 12.2 m (40 ft), or 40 ft 10 in (12.4 m)
- Draught: 5.8 m (19 ft)
- Depth of hold: 12 ft 2 in (3.7 m)
- Propulsion: Sail
- Complement: 330 and later 315 (British service)
- Armament: French service; UD: 28 × 18-pounder long guns; Spardeck: 12 × 8-pounder guns; British service; Upper deck: 28 × 18-pounder guns; QD: 16 × 32-pounder carronades; Fc: 2 × 12-pounder guns + 2 × 32-pounder carronades

Clorinde was a 44-gun Uranie-class frigate of the French Navy. The Royal Navy captured her in 1803 and took her into service as HMS Clorinde. She was sold in 1817.

== French naval service ==
She was laid down as Havraise in 1796, and was renamed to Clorinde before her commissioning in Nantes. In 1801, she was under Emmanuel Halgan.

In February 1802, under frigate captain Pierre-Marie Le Bozec, she was sent on station at Santo Domingo. She was surrendered to the British at the surrender of Cap Francais, along with Surveillante. The Royal Navy took her into service under her existing name.

== Royal Navy service ==
The Royal Navy commissioned Clorinde at Jamaica in May 1804 under Captain Robert O'Brien. She arrived at Plymouth on 23 July.

Between November 1807 and December 1808 Clorinde underwent repairs. In October, Captain Thomas Briggs recommissioned her. He sailed her to the East Indies on 17 February 1809.

On 28 January 1810 Clorinde captured the French privateer Henri. Henri was pierced for 14 guns, but mounted only eight 12-pounder guns. She had a crew of 57 men.

In November 1810, Clorinde was part of the squadron participating in the invasion of Isle de France.

In September 1814 Clorinde was under the command of Captain Samuel Pechell.

== Fate ==
The Principal Officers and Commissioners of His Majesty's Navy offered "Clorinde, of 38 guns and 1161 tons", lying at Deptford, for sale on 30 January 1817. The Royal Navy sold Clorinde on 6 March 1817 to Mr. Freake for £2,500.
