= Clerk of the course =

A clerk of the course is an official in various types of racing.

== Horse racing ==
In horse racing, the clerk of the course is the person responsible for track management and raceday preparation at a racecourse. Important tasks of the role include:

- deciding whether the course is fit to race;
- declaring the official going on the day of racing;
- monitoring the going in the run up to the race, and covering or watering the track as necessary to maintain a particular going;
- protecting sections of the turf from over use; and
- on National Hunt courses, preparing and managing fences.

They may also work with racecourse management on optimising the racecourse's fixture list.

== Auto racing ==
In auto racing, the clerk of the course is a designated official in charge of managing various aspects of circuit operations, including communication with course marshals, dispatching safety and rescue teams, oversight of track conditions, deploying and withdrawing the safety car and determining whether or not to suspend a race in case of dangerous conditions. Generally, the clerk of the course is directly subordinate to the race director or chief steward.
