= National Speakers Association =

- Abbreviation: NSA
- Formation: 1973
- Legal status: Active
- Headquarters: Minneapolis, MN
- Location: Minneapolis, MN
- Region served: USA
- Members: 3,500+
- CEO/President: Jaime Nolan, CAE
- Affiliations: Global Speakers Federation (GSF)
- Website: nsaspeaker.org

The National Speakers Association (NSA) is a US based association that supports motivational and other public speakers. It is the oldest and largest of 13 international associations comprising the Global Speakers Federation.

== History ==
NSA was founded in 1973 by Cavett Robert (1907–1997). Even though Robert suffered from stage fright in his younger years, he joined Toastmasters International and went on to receive his first paid speech at the age of 61. Cavett's idea for NSA began with 35 attendees of the Phoenix Summer Sales Seminar in 1969. He incorporated the National Speakers Association on 12 July 1973. In July 1979, Robert was honored with NSA's first Member of the Year Award, later renamed “The Cavett Award.” In honor of Robert's birthday, NSA celebrates the "Spirit of NSA" day every 14 November.

The association launched the Academy for Professional Speaking in January 2004 to teach those exploring a career in professional speaking. The academy consists of eLearning and the one-day Cavett Institute.

== Organizational structure and operations ==
In January 1991, the NSA moved into a new headquarters building at 1500 South Priest Drive in Tempe, Arizona. Following the COVID pandemic in 2020, NSA went fully remote and currently has its national office in Minneapolis, MN and 35 regional chapters throughout the United States. NSA's professional competencies were adopted in June 1985. They are known as the four E's: Eloquence, Expertise, Enterprise and Ethics.

=== Membership ===
NSA membership is available to paid professional speakers, entrepreneurs, authors, coaches and podcasters. Membership criteria include documented experience in professional speaking, such as earning a minimum income from speaking engagements, delivering a certain number of paid speeches annually, or combining paid speaking with other income-generating services like coaching or training. NSA also offers student memberships and affiliate opportunities for those aspiring to develop their speaking careers. Members are required to adhere to NSA's code of ethics and demonstrate a commitment to professional development and excellence in public speaking.

=== Events ===
NSA holds an annual national convention every summer featuring speakers in the industry. NSA's first Convention was held 1 June 1975 with 62 attendees gathered at the Scottsdale Camelback Inn.

NSA holds labs throughout the year. NSA's first lab was held 30 April 1994 at the International Center for Professional Speaking.

=== Local and regional chapters ===
The 35 individual chapters are led by an elected president and a board of directors. These chapters provide platforms for professional speakers to connect, learn, and grow within their local communities. Each chapter typically hosts monthly meetings featuring guest speakers and networking opportunities. Nationally, NSA has a Chapter Leadership Council composed of past presidents who serve as resources and volunteer consultants to current chapter leaders.

== CPAE Speaker Hall of Fame ==
In February 1977, the Association established the Council of Peers Award for Excellence (CPAE) Speaker Hall of Fame. This lifetime award was created to honor the organization's top professional speakers for their speaking excellence and professionalism. Inductees are evaluated by their peers on the different criteria. As of 2015, 232 men and women have been inducted; there are currently 172 living members.

== Certified Speaking Professional ==
Conferred by the Association, the Certified Speaking Professional (CSP) designation is the speaking profession's international measure of professional platform competence. In 2015, NSA recognized 51 professional speakers, the largest class of individuals to receive the designation at the Annual NSA Convention.

== Magazine ==
NSA also publishes a magazine 10 times annually in print and digital formats for the marketing strategies, tips, information and innovative ideas from professional speakers. NSA's magazine was rebranded and renamed to Speaker magazine in January 2007. A year later in June 2008, Speaker magazine went digital. In 2013, NSA launched SpeakerMagazine.com and introduced a mobile application

== Books ==
NSA has published following books

- Paid to Speak: Best Practices for Building a Successful Speaking Business. Greenleaf Book Group. 2011. ISBN 9781608321407.
- Association (U.S.), National Speakers (2012). Speak More!: Marketing Strategies to Get More Speaking Business. Greenleaf Book Group. ISBN 9781938416026.
- National Speakers Association: Celebrating 40 Years of Conventional Wisdom, describing the history of the National Speakers Association, highlighting the individuals, events, initiatives and programs involved in the association's growth and influence was published in July 2013.

== Notable members ==
- Les Brown
- Mark Victor Hansen
- Sally Hogshead
- Harvey Mackay
- Nido Qubein
- Laura Stack
- Zig Ziglar
- Monica Wofford
- Rich Hart
- Jim Cathcart
- Walter Bond
- Ron Karr
