= James Leander Cathcart =

American diplomat

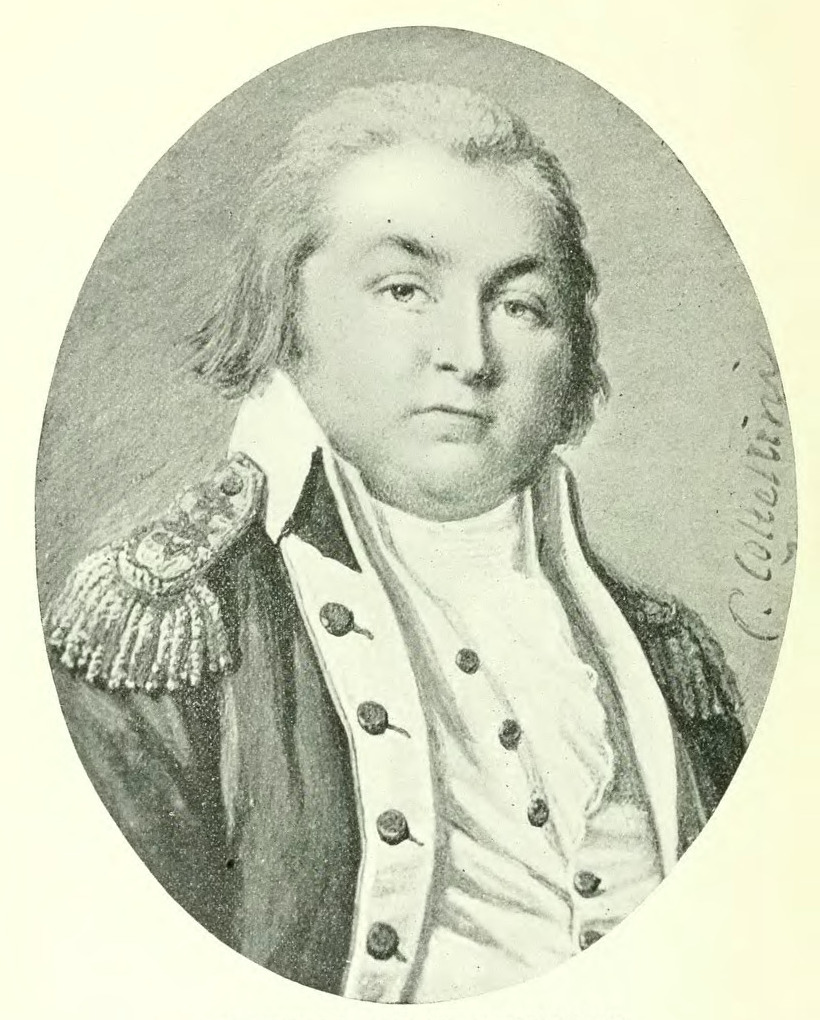
- Born: 1 June 1767
- Died: 6 October 1843

James Leander Cathcart (1 June 1767 – 6 October 1843) was an American diplomat, slave, and sailor of Irish descent. He is notable for his narrative as a slave in Algiers, Ottoman Algeria, for eleven years.

== Revolutionary War ==
Cathcart was born in Mount Murragh, County Westmeath, Ireland and emigrated to the North American colonies at eight years of age, under the care of a relative, Captain John Cathcart. He joined the American Revolution and at the age of twelve served on a privateer. Three years later, as a midshipman on The Confederacy, he was captured by the British and imprisoned on the prison ships The Good Hope and Jersey from which he escaped in 1782. He became fluent in Spanish and French, which he learned from fellow prisoners during his three-year internment.

== Slave in Algiers ==
In 1785, Barbary pirates captured the American merchant ship The Maria Boston, on its way to Cadiz carrying furs, lumber, and dried codfish. They took Cathcart and 20 other sailors as slaves. During the 11 years of his slavery in Algiers, Cathcart managed by means of good fortune, cleverness, and bribery to improve his circumstances, eventually becoming chief clerk to the Dey. In that position, he acted as a mediator between the Dey and Joseph Donaldson Jr., an agent for Colonel David Humphreys, the U.S. Minister to Portugal, which resulted in the Treaty of Algiers of 1796 and allowed his freedom.

Cathcart, for the first several years of his captivity, endured the same terrible living conditions as his fellow slaves. One of a few handpicked by the Dey, Cathcart's first duties were to work in the Dey's palace garden caring for the lions, tigers, and antelopes. Although his assigned duties were relatively light, his masters provided scant food and administered several beatings, called bastinado; in one instance, Cathcart lost several of his toenails.

As his fortunes and positions in Algiers improved, Cathcart acquired additional skills that he used later as a diplomat. He found opportunities to demonstrate his concern for his fellow prisoners. During his slavery, he became conversant in Arabic and Turkish. When Cathcart became clerk of the prison, he was able to buy several taverns, a house with servants, and more food for his fellow crew members. After the Treaty of Algiers freed them, Cathcart had the means to purchase a ship, which he sailed to Philadelphia in 1796 with 12 surviving members of the original crew.

== Personal ==
On 5 June 1798, he married Philadelphia belle Jane Bancker Woodside, and they had twelve children. His daughter JB Newkirk put together Cathcart's narrative and published it in 1899, 56 years after his death, under the title of The Captives, Eleven Years a Prisoner in Algiers.

== Professional diplomatic career ==
He returned to the Barbary Coast in December 1798, as special agent to William Eaton. In 1802, he was appointed US Consul to Tunis and Tripoli. He participated in the negotiation of additional treaties with Algiers, Tunis, and Tripoli. In 1806 he was appointed US Consul in Madeira, serving that position until 1815. He served the same position in Cádiz from 1815 to 1818, where he operated a merchant business with Richard Worsam Meade. Cathcart served in the diplomatic corps for the United States during the administrations of John Adams, Thomas Jefferson, and James Madison.

== See also ==
- List of slaves

== Sources ==
- Set, Base (1928–36), "James Leander Cathcart", Dictionary of American Biography, American Council of Learned Societies.
- "History", Arlington Oaks, archived from the original on 15 July 2007.
- Baker, Liva (April 1975), "Cathcart's Travels", American Heritage Magazine, archived from the original on 7 May 2006.
- Revolutionary War Pension S12413

Diplomatic posts
| Preceded by William Eaton | United States Consul General to the City of Tunis; 1802–7 | Unknown |
