= J. F. Cathcart =

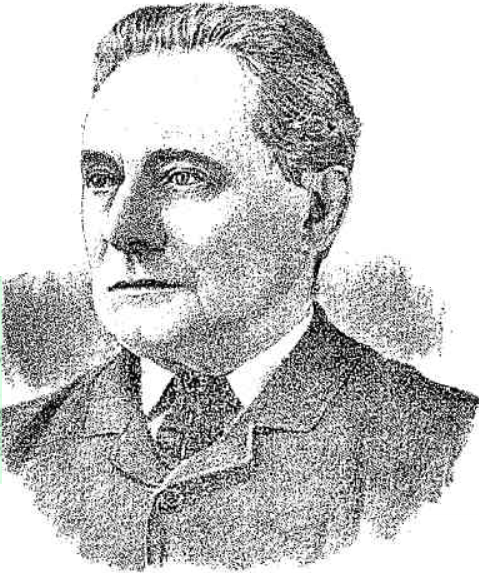
Portrait in The Lorgnette (1890)

James Faucett Cathcart (30 December 1827 – 18 December 1902), generally referred to as J. F. Cathcart, was an English actor, whose late career was in Australia. He was a brother of Fanny Cathcart.

== History ==
Cathcart was born in Hampshire, England, a son of the actor James Cathcart and brother of Fanny Cathcart, who emigrated to Australia in 1855 with G. V. Brooke. He first appeared on stage at age three as the infant Cora in Sheridan's Pizarro, and his first speaking part aged six in William Dimond's Hunter of the Alps.

As a young man he frequently played Glasgow's Theatre Royal, notably as Albert in Sheridan Knowles' William Tell. In 1850 he joined Charles Kean's company at the Princess's Theatre, Oxford-street, and would remain a member of his company for 18 years. He notably played Malcolm to Kean's Macbeth, a performance praised by Judge Talfourd in The Morning Post. He was with Keane in no fewer than 19 performances before the Queen and Prince Consort at Windsor Castle.

In 1863 he came with Mr and Mrs Kean to Australia, making their first appearance at the Haymarket Theatre, Melbourne, in a tour that lasted nine months before moving on to San Francisco in the Fanny Smale, then more in London and the English provinces. Kean died in 1868 and Cathcart joined Barry Sullivan, remaining with him for seven years, playing in both England and America.

Then he was called to Australia by his sister Fanny, in April 1879, and subsequently played with most of the significant theatre companies of the time: George Rignold, Williamson and Musgrove, Brough and Boucicault, and Charles Holloway.

Cathcart was a versatile actor, equally at home in a Sheridan comedy and a Shakespeare tragedy.

He died at his home, "Wilcannia", Charnwood Road, St Kilda, Victoria, and his remains interred in the Boroondara Cemetery.
